= Heron (surname) =

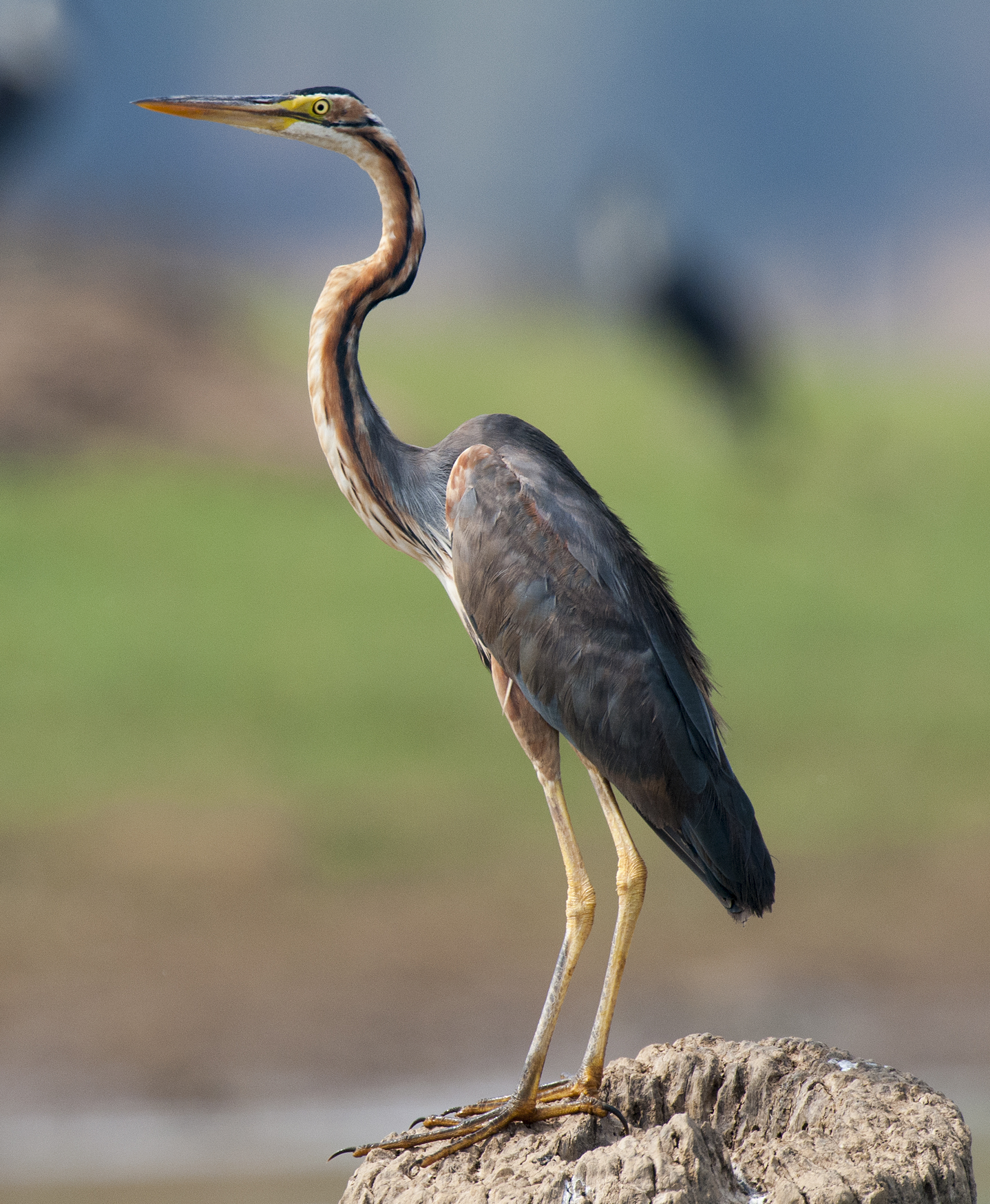
- A heron
- Language: English

Origin
- Languages: Old English, Old French, Irish Gaelic
- Meaning: Various; nickname for a tall, thin man resembling a heron; bird/heron hunter; habitational name from Harome or Le Héron; descendant of the feared one, the swarthy one or son of the servant of St. Ciaran
- Region of origin: British Isles, Normandy

Other names
- Variant forms: Herron, Herroun and Hairon

Heron (/hɛrən/) is a surname originating in the British Isles and Normandy during the Middle Ages.

== Origin ==
This name is believed to have more than one origin. In England, it is most commonly derived as nickname for a tall, thin man with long legs from Middle English heiroun/heyron itself coming from Old French hairon. It could also have designated a person who hunted birds, including herons. The surname may also be an habitual name; of Old English origin from Harome in North Yorkshire or Norman origin from Le Héron, near Rouen.

In Ireland, this surname is often an Anglicised form of any one of three Irish Gaelic names: "O'hEarain", descendant of the feared one; "O'Huidhrin", descendant of the swarthy one; or "Mac GiollaChiarain", son of the servant of St. Ciaran. The name Heron can also come from Ó Eachthighearna, which means "descendant of the horse lord".

An early recorded spelling of the family name is shown to be that of William de Herun, which was dated 1150, in the "Pipe Rolls of Yorkshire". The name became prominent on the Anglo-Scottish border as a clan of border reivers operating between the late 13th century to the beginning of the 17th century. Today, in the United Kingdom the surname is most commonly found in County Down, Tyne and Wear, Surrey and Lancashire.

== Notable people with the surname ==
- Alastair Heron (1915–2009), British author
- Alexander Heron (1884–1971), Scottish geologist and Director of the Geological Survey of India
- Alexander Heron Jr. (1818–1865), Irish-American businessman
- Brian Heron (born 1948), Scottish footballer
- Caroline Heron (born 1990), Scottish footballer
- Colin Heron (1924–2010), Jamaican cricketer
- Craig Heron, Canadian historian
- Denis Caulfield Heron (1824–1881), Irish lawyer and politician
- Eddie Heron (1910–1985), Irish high diving and springboard diving champion
- Edward Thomas Heron (1867–1949), English industrialist and printing entrepreneur
- Francis Heron (1853–1914), English footballer
- Francis Arthur Heron (1864–1940), English entomologist
- Frederick Heron (1944–2010), American NFL footballer
- George Heron (1919–2011), President of the Seneca Nation of Indians
- Gil Heron (1922–2008), Jamaican footballer
- Gilbert Heron (1854–1876), Scottish rugby player
- Giles Heron (1504–1540), English politician
- Haly Heron (1550–1591), English essayist and soldier
- Henry Heron, English soldier
- Henry Heron (1675–1730), British politician
- Hilary Heron (1923–1977), Irish sculptor
- Hillary Heron (born 2004), Panamanian gymnast
- Hubert Heron (1852–1914), English footballer
- Jack Heron (1926–2012), American basketball coach
- Jacob Heron (born 1999), Australian rules footballer
- Jim Heron (1940–2023), Canadian politician
- Sir John Heron (1470–1522), English courtier during reigns of Henry VII and Henry VIII
- John Heron (social scientist) (1928–2022), English social scientist
- Sir Joseph Heron (1809–1889), English lawyer and municipal administrator
- Joyce Heron (1916–1980), English actress
- Julia Heron (1897–1977), American set decorator
- Justin Herron (born 1995), American football player
- Keith Heron (1890–1975), Australian rules footballer
- Louis Héron (1746–1796), French revolutionary
- Martin Heron, Northern Ireland sculptor
- Martin Wilkes Heron (1850–1920), bartender and creator of Southern Comfort
- Mary Heron (fl. 1786–1792), English writer
- Mary Dorothea Heron (c. 1897 – 1960), first woman to be admitted to the Roll of Solicitors in Ireland
- Matilda Heron (1830–1877), popular Irish-American actress
- Meredith Heron, Canadian interior designer
- Mike Heron (born 1942), Scottish musician and composer
- Mustapha Heron (born 1997), American basketball player
- Oscar Heron (1896–1933), Irish fighter pilot
- Patrick Heron (1736–1803), Scottish politician and banker, MP for Kirkcudbright Stewartry 1795–1803
- Patrick Heron (died 1761), Scottish politician, MP for Kirkcudbright Stewartry 1727–41
- Patrick Heron (1920–1999), St Ives, Cornwall, painter
- Paula Heron, Canadian-American physicist
- Percy Heron (1892–1950), Australian rules footballer
- Sir Richard Heron, 1st Baronet (1726–1805), Chief Secretary for Ireland
- Robert Heron (1764–1807), Scottish writer
- Sir Robert Heron, 2nd Baronet (1765–1854), British Whig politician, Member of Parliament (MP) for Great Grimsby 1812–18 and Peterborough 1819–47
- Samuel Dalziel Heron (S.D. Heron) (1893–1965), aerospace engineer
- Susanna Heron (born 1949), British artist who works primarily between drawing, sculpture, scale and movement
- Thomas Heron (1879–1928), Australian trade unionist and politician
- Wallace Heron (1924–1990), New Zealand pole vaulter
- Edward Heron-Allen (1861–1943), English writer, scientist and Persian scholar
- John Heron-Maxwell (1836–1899), Scottish Liberal politician
- Gil Scott-Heron (1949–2011), American poet and civil rights activist
