= Robert Stoepel =

German-born American composer and conductor (1821-1887)

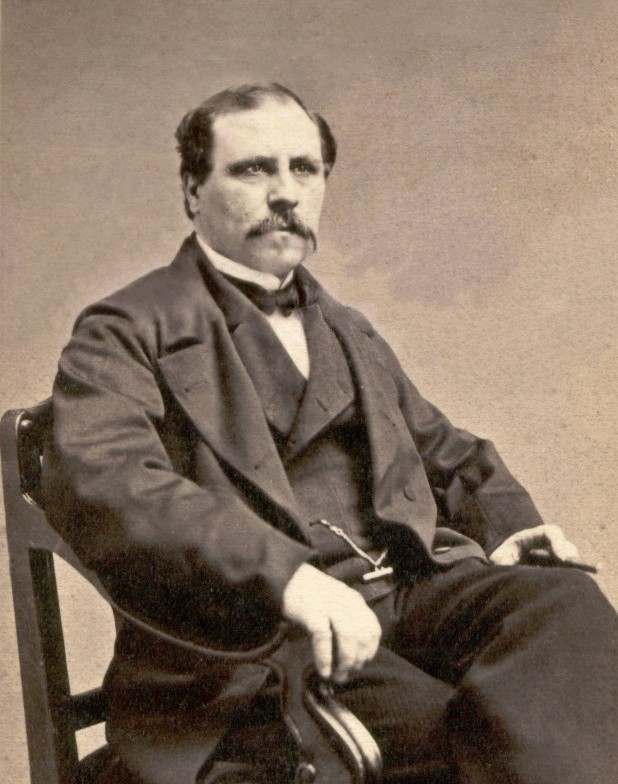
- Photograph portrait (carte de visite), c. 1875
- Born: Auguste Stöpel; 1821; Berlin, German Confederation
- Died: 1 October 1887 (aged 66); New York City, U.S.
- Education: Berlin Conservatory of Music; Conservatoire de Paris
- Occupations: Composer; Conductor
- Era: Romantic
- Notable work: Hiawatha (1859)
- Spouse: Matilda Heron (m. 1857; sep. 1869)
- Children: Bijou Heron
- Relatives: Gilbert Miller (grandson)

Robert Auguste Stoepel (born Auguste Stöpel, 1821 – 1 October 1887) was a German-born American composer and conductor. His compositions include Hiawatha, a symphony for orchestra and vocal soloists, as well as incidental music for plays, piano works, songs, and several operas. Born in Berlin, Stoepel worked in Paris and London, but spent a large portion of his career in New York City where he died at the age of 66. From 1857 until their separation in 1869, he was married to the actress Matilda Heron. Their daughter Bijou Heron was also an actress.

== Biography ==
Robert Stoepel was born Auguste Stöpel in Berlin in 1821. Because his father had a reputation as a court musician, he adopted his forename. His sister, Hélène Stöpel, was noted as a "charming and talented pianist." (She later married the composer William Vincent Wallace.) After he graduated from the Berlin Conservatory of music, he went to Paris where he graduated from the Conservatoire de Paris, where his teachers included Luigi Cherubini, Fromental Halévy, and Friedrich Kalkbrenner. He got his start at composing incidental music for dramas there, being one of three composers who contributed to a stage production of Monte-Cristo, a play by Alexandre Dumas and Auguste Maquet which premiered on 3 February 1848 at the Théâtre Historique. According to his obituary in the Musical Times, while in Paris he wrote two operas, Indiana and Charlemagne. In an 1849 article in the Musical World it was noted that he was negotiating with John Medex Maddox to produce his opera, La sentinelle perdu, for the Princess Theatre in London, and that he had already composed a ballet which was performed at the Paris Opera.

In 1850, impresario Max Maretzek brought him to New York City. His first association was with Wallack's Theatre, where he wrote and conducted incidental music for plays. In 1856 The New York Times reported: "The orchestra of this establishment [i.e., Wallack's Theatre] is deliciously neat and effective, and the compositions it plays are thoroughly artistic. Mr. Robert Stoepel, the conductor, is one of the best informed musicians in the country, and the evidence of taste and knowledge are never absent. He has succeeded in making the musical department an important feature of the entertainments, and if the orchestra always plays as well as it did on Saturday night we are not at all surprised thereat."

He wrote incidental music for all of the plays written by Dion Boucicault during his stay in New York from 1854 through 1860. He was the conductor of many New York productions of Offenbach operettas, including La Grande-Duchesse de Gérolstein, La Vie parisienne, Fleur de Thé, and Geneviève de Brabant.

His most ambitious compositional effort was Hiawatha based on Henry Wadsworth Longfellow's poem The Song of Hiawatha. Subtitled "an Indian Symphony," this was a work symphonic in proportions with vocal soloists and a part for narrator. It was first performed by the Mendelssohn Union with soloists Mrs. I.I. Harwood (who alternated between the two female roles of Nokomis and Minnehaha), Harrison Millard (Hiawatha), J. Q. Wetherbee (who sang the Great Spirit and the Arrow-Maker) with recitations by the composer's wife Matilda Heron, on 21 February 1859 at the Boston Theatre in Boston. It was performed in New York shortly thereafter. Hiawatha had its London premiere on February 11, 1861.

He stayed at Wallack's Theatre throughout the 1860s. He also worked for the Winter Garden Theatre. After it burnt down in 1867, he worked for Daly's Fifth Avenue Theatre. There he composed and conducted incidental music for the stage productions The Hurricane, Divorce, Frou-Frou, Man and Wife, and Fernande.

Sometime in the 1870s he moved to London where he was engaged by Henry Miller. He composed incidental music for all of Miller's first successes. When Miller came to New York, Stoepel found that Miller was still using his music, so he filed a suit against him and settled for $2,000. During the 1880–81 season he was musical director of the Adelphi Theatre in London. While in London he wrote an opera called Aldershot.

Around 1884 he became deaf, and apparently moved back to New York. At the time of his death he was working on two more operas, Unita and The Mahdi. The Musical Times obituary mentions that at once time he amassed a fortune of £20,000, but lost £12,000 during a real estate panic in New York.

== Personal life ==
In 1857 he married the actress Matilda Heron. Stoepel and Heron separated in 1869. They had one child, Helen Wallace Stoepel, born in 1863, better known as Bijou Heron, who became an actress herself. Bijou married Stoepel's employer, Henry Miller, and had three children with him, including theatrical producer Gilbert Miller.

At the end of his life, Stoepel had been living at 40 West 24th Street. He died at his daughter's house, 70 West 37th Street, on 1 October 1887.

== List of works ==
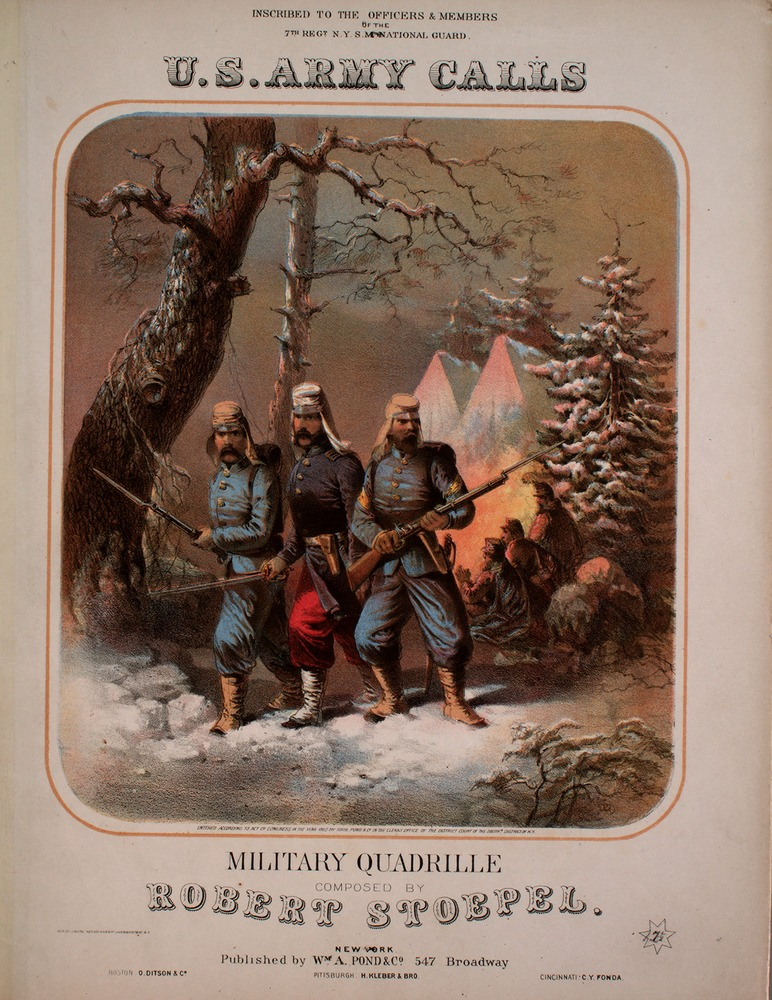
Cover of the sheet music for Stoepel's 1862 military quadrille, "U.S. Army Calls"

=== Operas ===
- Aldershot
- Charlemagne
- La sentinelle perdu
- Indiana
- The Mahdi
- The False Prophet, libretto by J. Armoy Knox and Chas. M. Snyder. (1887)

=== Songs ===
- Smiles of a summer night
- Toujours!
- Le soldat mourant (1844) song; translated into English by Jacob Wrey Mould as The dying soldier
- Near thee, near thee (1854)
- Serenade (1856)
- The old clock on the stairs (1874) words by Longfellow
- Safe from the wreck! (1880) words by T. Hay Campbell
- La Caridad (1840–1849) Rendered into English by J.W. Mould from the French of A. Marcien

=== Works for piano ===
- Mazurka on Meyerbeer's opera Le pardon de Ploërmel (Dinorah)
- Polka Summer Night in the Woods
- Imperial Green Seal Galop
- Selection, on Donizetti's Grand Opera Les martyrs (Poliuto)
- The Quadrille of All Nations
- Les bluets (1844)
- Les lilas (1844)
- The Sutherland Polka (1844)
- The Cellarius Polkas (1845)
- Souvenirs de bohême (1845)
- The Timbrel Waltz (1846)
- Chant national hongrois (1850s)
- The Witches in Macbeth (1850)
- The Marco Spada Polka (1853) quadrilles based on Daniel Auber's opera of the same name
- Camille mazurka (1856) "as played at the New Orleans Gaiety Theatre"
- Fairy Star schottisch (1856)
- Première rencontre: nocturne pour piano (1857)
- The Lester Wallack Polka (1862)
- U.S. Army Calls (1862) quadrilles
- Jean Hosmer Polka (1865)
- Reminiscences of Leah (1868)
- Frou Frou Waltz (1870)

=== Incidental music and other works ===
- Ruling Passion (Wallack's Theatre, 1859)
- The Romance of a Poor Young Man (Wallack's Theatre, 1860)
- The Duke's Motto (Niblo's Garden, 1863)
- Columbus Reconstructed (Winter Garden, 1866)
- The Merchant of Venice (revival with Edwin Booth)
- Le roi carotte (Grand Opera House, Manhattan, 1872)
