= Titian hair =

Brownish-orange hair

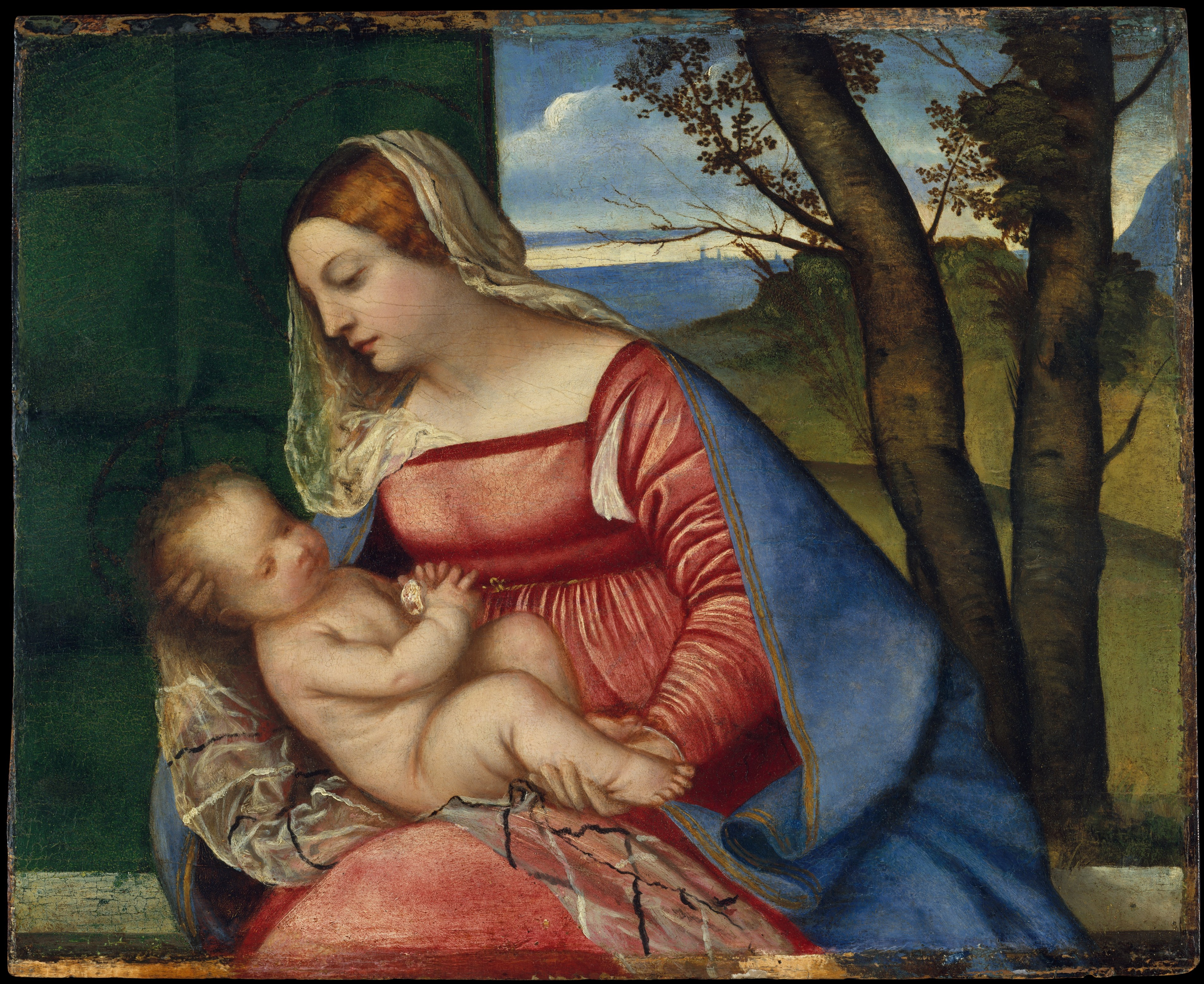
Madonna and Child (c. 1508), by Titian

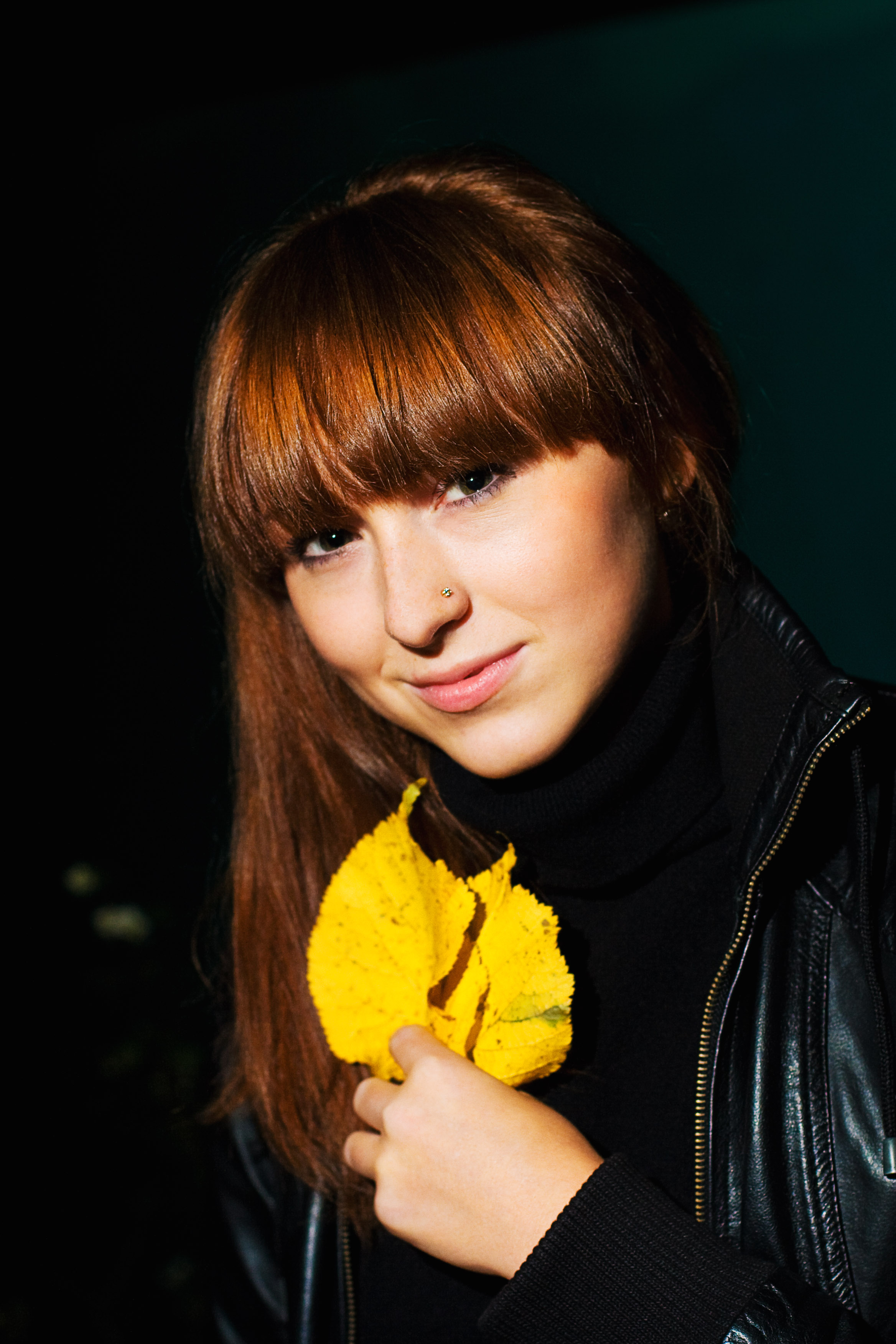
A young woman with chestnut hair

Titian is a tint of red hair, most commonly described as brownish-orange in color.

== Etymology ==
The term originates from Titian, an Italian painter who would often depict women with red hair of this description. Titian has been used as a hair color term in the United States as early as the 1800s, when women were commonly using henna to dye their hair a Titian color.

== Discrepancy ==
Titian is commonly misused as a synonym for hair colors with similar definitions or hues of color.

Titian hair is frequently mistaken with what is called Venetian hair due to similar definitions and origins. Definitions of Venetian hair describe it as being reddish and golden in quality, but the distinction between the two is that Titian is a golden-brown, and Venetian a golden-blond. The two are also often referred to as Titian-red and Venetian-blond, respectively, to emphasize the distinction. The origins of the formulas to create these hair colors by dyeing are also the same. As the Venetian women had more methods to lighten their hair, the term Venetian has become specifically associated with the blond variety.

The term Titian is sometimes misapplied to auburn hair. Whereas Titian hair is a brownish shade of red hair, auburn hair is a brownish shade of hair encompassing the actual color red. Most definitions of Titian hair describe it as a brownish-orange color, but some describe it as being reddish. Williams Gillum identified four types of Titian hair of varying darkness and intensity. This is in reference to red hair itself, not the color red.

== Characters in popular culture with Titian hair ==
Titian Red

Color coordinates
- Hex triplet: #BD5620
- sRGB^{B} (r, g, b): (189, 86, 32)
- HSV (h, s, v): (21°, 83%, 74%)
- CIELCh_{uv} (L, C, h): (49, 92, 25°)
- Source: RAL Colours
- B: Normalized to [0–255] (byte)

- Anne Shirley of Anne of Green Gables is described as having Titian hair at age 15:

Well, we heard him say—didn’t we, Jane?—‘Who is that girl on the platform with the splendid Titian hair? She has a face I should like to paint.’ There now, Anne. But what does Titian hair mean?”

“Being interpreted it means plain red, I guess,” laughed Anne. “Titian was a very famous artist who liked to paint red-haired women.”

— L. M. Montgomery, Anne of Green Gables

- Nancy Drew, titular character of the mystery fiction series of books, was described as and depicted with Titian hair from 1959 to 1960.
- Midge, the Barbie doll, has Titian hair. From 1961 until 1967, Mattel offered Titian hair for dolls, with Midge being the staple for the variant. Midge's packaging illustration featured this hair color, whereas the original Barbie character was typically given blonde hair.
- Dana Scully (played by Gillian Anderson), from The X-Files, has naturally Titian hair, as confirmed by Chris Carter, the show's creator, on Reddit in 2014. Scully was seen with this shade in earlier seasons of the series before being shown with a more fiery, dyed shade of red hair in later years.
