= Jules Bache =

American banker, art collector (1861–1944)

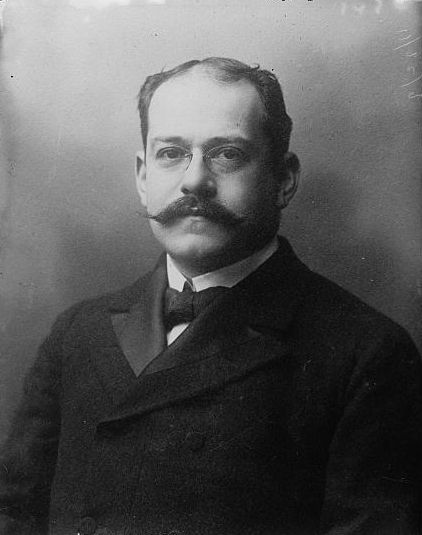
- Bache in 1911
- Born: Jules Semon Bache; November 9, 1861; New York City
- Died: March 24, 1944 (aged 82); Palm Beach, Florida
- Occupation: Banker
- Spouse: Florence R. Scheftel (m. 1892)
- Children: Kathryn Bache Miller
- Family: Gilbert Miller (son-in-law)

Jules Semon Bache (November 9, 1861 – March 24, 1944) was an American banker, art collector and philanthropist.

== Early life ==
Jules Bache was born into a Jewish family in New York City. His father, Semon Bache [né Bach], emigrated to the United States from his native Nuremberg, Bavaria, settling in New York City, where he started the glassmaking firm Semon Bache & Company.

== Career ==
In 1881, he started work as a cashier at Leopold Cahn & Co., a stockbrokerage firm founded by his uncle. In 1886, he was made a minority partner, and in 1892, he took full control of the business, renaming it J. S. Bache & Co. Jules Bache built the company into one of the top brokerage houses in the United States, outranked only by Merrill Lynch. In the process, he became an immensely wealthy individual, a patron of the arts, and a philanthropist.

During World War I, Jules Bache donated money to the American Field Service in France, and his wife was the honorary treasurer of the "War Babies' Cradle," a charity that provided aid for mothers and children in distress in war-torn Northern France and Belgium to provide them with food, clothing, heating fuel, and medical care.

In the 1920 presidential election, Bache was a presidential elector for Warren G. Harding and Calvin Coolidge.

Jules Bache was a shareholder of a number of prominent corporations and sat on the boards of directors of many of them. Among his personal holdings, Bache had sizeable interests in Canadian mining companies. His equity in these companies was held by his Bahamas-based corporation, which allowed him to legally avoid some of the high personal U.S. surtaxes, a fact for which he would be publicly criticized as a result of the Federal investigations during the 1930s into the causes of the Wall Street Crash of 1929. Bache, however, believed that high taxation was a hindrance to economic growth and published a booklet titled "Release business from the slavery of taxation." A major shareholder in Dome Mines Limited, Bache served as company president from 1919 until 1942 and was Chairman of the Board at the time of his passing. After the brokerage firm of Dillon, Read & Co. acquired the Dodge Brothers Automobile Company in 1923, Jules Bache acquired a substantial position in Chrysler Corporation.

A supporter of American theater and Broadway, Jules Bache helped found the New York branch of the Escholier Club in 1941.

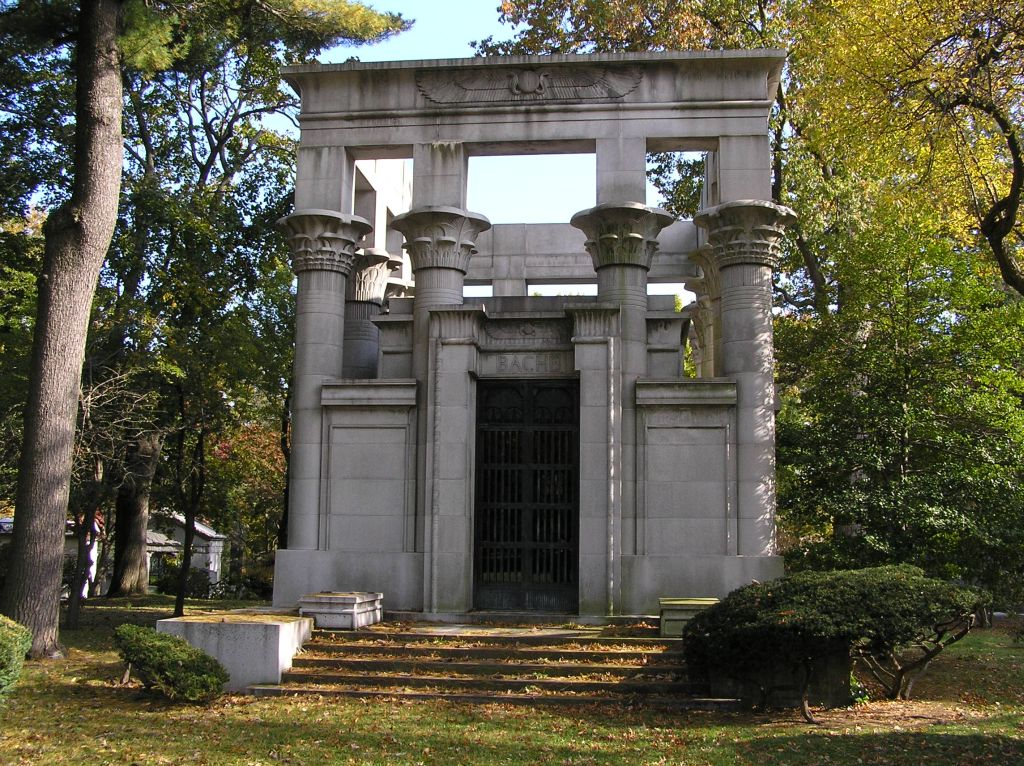
The mausoleum of Jules Bache

== Personal life and death ==
Bache married Florence R. Scheftel on May 23, 1892, and they had two daughters.

Jules Bache died in 1944 in Palm Beach, Florida, and was interred in the Woodlawn Cemetery in the Bronx, New York. His tomb is a replica of Trajan's Kiosk at Philae. In 1927, his daughter, Kathryn Bache Miller, married the theatrical producer Gilbert Miller in Paris, France. His granddaughter, Muriel Bache Richards, married Francis Warren Pershing, the son of General John J. Pershing.

He told the Literary Digest his name was pronounced Baitch, "A rhyme with aitch." (Charles Earle Funk, What's the Name, Please?, Funk & Wagnalls, 1936.)

== Art collection ==
In addition to his high profile in the business world, Jules Bache would also become well known for his art collecting, which received much press attention in 1929 when he purchased the portrait of "Giuliano de Medici," then attributed to Raphael. He would acquire numerous other important works, including those by or attributed to Rembrandt, Titian (including the Bache Madonna), Albrecht Dürer, Diego Velázquez, Gerard David, Giovanni Bellini, and Sandro Botticelli, amongst others.

In 1937, he opened his magnificent art collection to the public. In 1943 the Second World War forced closure of his museum and the collection was lent to the Metropolitan Museum of Art which had put its own masterworks into protective storage. In 1943, he donated some of his works to the Detroit Institute of Arts.

Bache was a major donor to the Department of Decorative Arts at the Metropolitan Museum of Art.

At the time of his death in 1944, most of his picture collection, up until that time gifted to the Jules Bache Foundation, was given to the Museum; the remaining works of art from his estate at 814 Fifth Avenue were sold at auction.

| image | title | painter | date | accession number | The Met url |
|---|---|---|---|---|---|
| | Madonna and Child with Saints | Giovanni Bellini | | 49.7.1 | MET |
| | Madonna and Child | Workshop of Giovanni Bellini | 1510 | 49.7.2 | MET |
| | Portrait of a Young Man | Jacometto Veneziano | | 49.7.3 | MET |
| | The Coronation of the Virgin | Follower of Botticelli | 1500s | 49.7.4 | MET |
| | Madonna Lenti | Carlo Crivelli | 1472 | 49.7.5 | MET |
| | Portrait of a Woman | Master of the Castello Nativity | 1450s | 49.7.6 | MET |
| | Francesco Sassetti and His Son Teodoro | Domenico Ghirlandaio | 1488s | 49.7.7 | MET |
| | Descent from the Cross | Girolamo da Cremona | | 49.7.8 | MET |
| | Madonna and Child Enthroned with Two Angels | Filippo Lippi | 1440s | 49.7.9 | MET |
| | Madonna and Child | Filippino Lippi | 1483s | 49.7.10 | MET |
| | Rodolfo Gonzaga (1451–1495) | Style of Andrea Mantegna | 1500s | 49.7.11 | MET |
| | Giuliano de' Medici (1479–1516), Duke of Nemours | Copy after Raphael | 1600s | 49.7.12 | MET |
| | Madonna and Child | Luca Signorelli | | 49.7.13 | MET |
| | Portrait of a Man | Lambert Sustris | | 49.7.14 | MET |
| | Madonna and Child | Titian | 1510 | 49.7.15 | MET |
| | Venus and Adonis | Titian | 1560 | 49.7.16 | MET |
| | The Flight into Egypt | Cosimo Tura | | 49.7.17 | MET |
| | Virgin and Child | Workshop of Dieric Bouts | 1475 | 49.7.18 | MET |
| | Portrait of a Carthusian | Petrus Christus | 1446 | 49.7.19 | MET |
| | The Nativity with Donors and Saints Jerome and Leonard | Gerard David | | 49.7.20a–c | MET |
| | The Rest on the Flight into Egypt | Gerard David | 1513s | 49.7.21 | MET |
| | Virgin and Child | Workshop of Hans Memling | 1490 | 49.7.22 | MET |
| | Young Woman with a Pink | Hans Memling | 1485 | 49.7.23 | MET |
| | Portrait of a Man in a Turban | Netherlandish Painter | 1460s | 49.7.24 | MET |
| | Anthony van Dyck self portrait (Metropolitan Museum of Art) | Anthony van Dyck | 1620 | 49.7.25 | MET |
| | Portrait of Robert Rich, second earl of Warwick | Anthony van Dyck | 1634 | 49.7.26 | MET |
| | Portrait of an Italian Woman | German painter | 1600s | 49.7.27 | MET |
| | Portrait of a Man (Sir Ralph Sadler?) | Workshop of Hans Holbein the Younger | 1535 | 49.7.28 | MET |
| | Derick Berck of Cologne | Hans Holbein the Younger | 1536 | 49.7.29 | MET |
| | Portrait of a Young Woman | Workshop of Hans Holbein the Younger | 1540 | 49.7.30 | MET |
| | Edward VI (1537–1553), When Duke of Cornwall | Workshop of Hans Holbein the Younger | 1545 | 49.7.31 | MET |
| | Portrait of a Young Woman | an anonymous Netherlandish painter | 1535 | 49.7.32 | MET |
| | Portrait of Claes Duyst van Voorhout | Frans Hals | 1638 | 49.7.33 | MET |
| | Portrait of a Bearded Man with a Ruff | Frans Hals | 1625 | 49.7.34 | MET |
| | Portrait of Floris Soop | Rembrandt | 1654 | 49.7.35 | MET |
| | Man in a Red Cloak | Rembrandt | 1650s | 49.7.36 | MET |
| | Christ with a Staff | Rembrandt | 1661 | 49.7.37 | MET |
| | The Curious | Gerard ter Borch | 1660 | 49.7.38 | MET |
| | Portrait of a Young Boy | Sébastien Bourdon | 1700s | 49.7.39 | MET |
| | A Young Woman Reading | Han van Meegeren | 1926s | 49.7.40 | MET |
| | Don Manuel Osorio de Zúñiga | Francisco Goya | 1787 | 49.7.41 | MET |
| | Portrait of a Man | Diego Velázquez | 1630s | 49.7.42 | MET |
| | María Teresa (1638–1683), Infanta of Spain | Diego Velázquez | 1651 | 49.7.43 | MET |
| | Charles de Cossé (1506–1563), Comte de Brissac | Corneille de Lyon | 1600s | 49.7.44 | MET |
| | Portrait of a Man with a Black-Plumed Hat | Corneille de Lyon | 1535 | 49.7.45 | MET |
| | The Interrupted Sleep | François Boucher | 1750 | 49.7.46 | MET |
| | Marie Rinteau, called Mademoiselle de Verrières | François-Hubert Drouais | 1761 | 49.7.47 | MET |
| | Boy with a Black Spaniel | François-Hubert Drouais | | 49.7.48 | MET |
| | The Love Letter | Jean-Honoré Fragonard | 1770s | 49.7.49 | MET |
| | The Cascade | Jean-Honoré Fragonard | | 49.7.50 | MET |
| | A Shaded Avenue | Jean-Honoré Fragonard | | 49.7.51 | MET |
| | The Fair at Bezons | Jean-Baptiste Pater | | 49.7.52 | MET |
| | Alexandre Charles Emmanuel de Crussol-Florensac (1743–1815) | Louise Élisabeth Vigée Le Brun | 1787 | 49.7.53 | MET |
| | The French Comedians | Antoine Watteau | | 49.7.54 | MET |
| | Queen Charlotte | Thomas Gainsborough | | 49.7.55 | MET |
| | Anne Elizabeth Cholmley (1769–1788), Later Lady Mulgrave | Gainsborough Dupont | | 49.7.56 | MET |
| | Lady Elizabeth Hamilton (1753–1797), Countess of Derby | George Romney | | 49.7.57 | MET |
| | Henri d'Albret (1503–55), King of Navarre | enamels highlighted in The MET collection | 1556 | 49.7.108 | MET |
| | Jules Semon Bache | Jo Davidson | 1936 | 49.7.120 | MET |
