= Alexander Heron (disambiguation) =

Alexander Heron (1884–1971) was a Scottish geologist.

Alexander Heron may also refer to:

- Alexander Heron Jr. (c. 1818–1865), Philadelphia businessman
- Alec Heron (1889–1964), English footballer who appeared for Bournemouth
