= Matilda Heron =

American actress

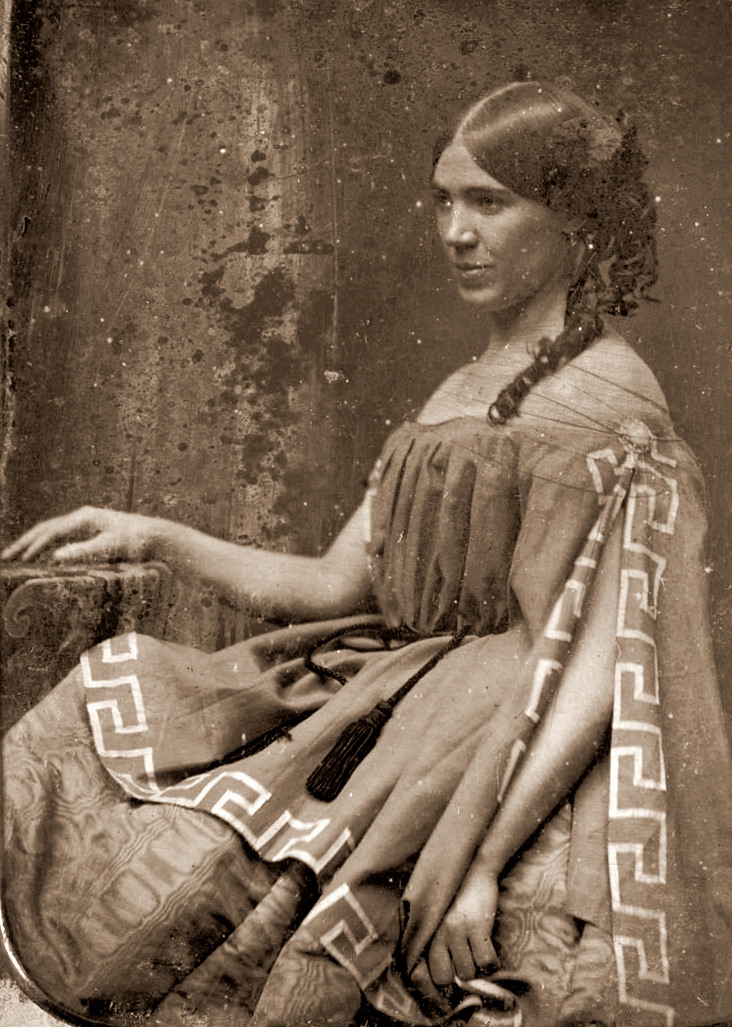
- Matilda Heron as Medea in Medea
- Born: 1 December 1830; County Londonderry, Ireland
- Died: 7 March 1877 (aged 46); New York City, U.S.
- Occupation: Actress
- Spouses: Henry Herbert Byrne (m. 1854; sep. 1854) Robert Stoepel (m. 1857; sep. 1869)
- Children: Bijou Heron
- Relatives: Alexander Heron Jr. (brother); Gilbert Heron Miller (grandson)

Matilda Agnes Heron (1 December 1830 – 7 March 1877) was an Irish-American actress and playwright best known for her role in the play Camille, which she translated and adapted from the French play La Dame aux Camélias.

== Early life ==
Matilda Agnes Heron was born in County Londonderry, Ireland on 1 December 1830 to John Heron and Mary Heron (née Laughlin). Some details of Matilda Heron's past are unsure, but many records state that her family owned a small farm in Ireland before emigrating to the United States in 1842. Matilda was around twelve at the time. Her family moved to Philadelphia, Pennsylvania where her father worked as a lumber merchant. Matilda was the youngest of five children. Her siblings include two sisters named Fanny and Agnes and a brother named Alexander. Her brother, Alexander Heron Jr., was a successful shipper. In some sources, her sisters, Fanny and Agnes, are reported to have been excellent singers. It is possible that Matilda and her sisters received stage training in Ireland, but this is not confirmed. In Philadelphia, Matilda's parents sent her to a private academy that was across from the Walnut Street Theatre. Being so close to the theatre sparked Matilda's interest in acting, and she began to train for the stage under elocution teacher, Peter Richings.

== Early career ==
Heron made her professional stage debut on 17 February 1851 in Philadelphia at the Walnut Street Theatre. She played the role of Bianca in Henry Hart Milman's tragic play, Fazio. After receiving positive reviews from the press, she decided to continue acting. For the next two years, she worked in stock theatre companies in Washington, New York, Philadelphia, and Boston where she portrayed a wide range of heroines such as Lady Macbeth, Juliet, and Ophelia. In 1853, she traveled to California, where she continued to work as an actress. She made her California debut in San Francisco on 26 December 1853. She continued to perform in California and received much critical acclaim for her work there. In the summer of 1854, she returned to New York.

== Camille ==
While in Paris in 1855, Heron saw the popular play La Dame aux Camélias (The Lady of the Camellias), and decided to present her own version, in English, in America. The resulting Camille, premiered at the Walnut Street Theatre in Philadelphia on 3 October 1855 with Heron playing the protagonist Marguerite Gautier. The play did not receive much attention at the Walnut Street Theatre, nor at any locations on the tour that followed. Eventually, Camille came to St. Louis in January 1856 and had great success there. Camille had successful performances in Cincinnati, Mobile, and New Orleans as well. On 22 January 1857, Camille made its New York debut at Wallack's Theatre and was an immediate success. Edward Askew Sothern played the role of the lover, Armand Duval.

The play created a sensation. Matilda Heron's impulsive and rough nature aided her in developing a style of acting new for her day. Breaking with convention, she followed her feelings in her acting rather than the rules of elocution. Starting with Jean Davenport in 1853, most of the female stars of the day had appeared in the role, but Matilda Heron's Camille, more true to the original, was generally acknowledged to be the greatest on the American stage.

Her emotion-charged acting and personal magnetism, particularly in the role of Marguerite Gautier with which she became so closely identified, hypnotized audiences and critics alike with her captivating beauty. For eight years after her initial triumph she acted with comparative success in New York, London, and on tour throughout the United States, appearing as the lead in plays she had written or adapted herself. She continued to enact the role of Marguerite Gautier in New York theaters. In 1859, she was welcomed as Gautier at McVicker's Theater in Chicago; she returned to Chicago again in 1862. Her adaptation was seen in most of the important cities of the country. In New York during the season which she appeared in other plays, including her translation of Ernest Legouvé's Médée, marked the highest peak of her career. Of her role in Camille, prominent theater critic William Winter later wrote: "Other parts she acted; that one she lived."

Heron left no explanations of her theory of acting, but there is evidence that she identified herself closely with this role; while she achieved only minimal success in any role other than Camille, her minor successes bore strong resemblance to the Camille character. In fact, it is reported that, later in her career, while speaking to an author who was to write a play for her, she was careful to state that the heroine must be "a lost woman." The "lost woman" was a type that Matilda Heron identified with, both in her personal life and on stage. It is known that Heron's sister was a prostitute and that the actress kept close ties with her sister in spite of condemnation from family and friends. In fact, her sister's profession was implicated as being a factor in the break-up of Matilda Heron's first marriage.

== Personal life ==
In June 1854, Heron married San Franciscan lawyer, Henry Herbert Byrne. The couple separated only a few months later. Not much is known about Heron's marriage to Byrne. Following their separation, Heron returned to the East Coast.

On 24 December 1857 Heron married composer and accomplished musician Robert Stoepel after meeting him in New Orleans at a performance of Camille. At the time, Stoepel was the leader of the orchestra at Wallack's Theatre. The couple had an unhappy marriage and their domestic troubles caused them to separate in 1869. Not much is known about the nature of Heron and Stoepel's separation, but some accounts state that Heron lied to Stoepel about her previous marriage to Henry Herbert Byrne. According to Byrne and his lawyers the divorce was not a legal divorce, resulting in Heron being married to both Byrne and Stoepel. Upon their separation in 1869, Heron and Stoepel agreed to split their properties equally.

In 1863, Heron gave birth to a daughter, Helen Wallace Stoepel, better known as Bijou Heron, who became an actress herself. After her parents' separation in 1869, Bijou went to the care of Stoepel. To educate her, he sent her first to a convent and then to a boarding school in New York City. Heron pulled her daughter out of the boarding school and trained her for the stage. Bijou made her stage debut at the age of six performing alongside her mother in Medea. On 1 February 1883 Bijou married the celebrated actor and producer Henry Miller and became the mother of the theatrical producer Gilbert Heron Miller.

Heron's nickname was "Tilly" which was short for Matilda. She sometimes referred to herself by this nickname.

== Later life ==
Matilda Heron's popularity was comparatively brief. Her tempestuous style of acting limited her to the "emotional" role and the "sensational" play. By the mid-1860s, Heron's health was failing, marital difficulties impinged upon her work, and the brilliance of her reputation began to fade. From 1868 until her death she supported herself by teaching acting. In her last years she was ill and impoverished. A devout Catholic, she found solace in her religion, but her daughter was her chief source of happiness. A big benefit show was done to raise funds for her in January 1872, which included Edwin Booth, Jules Levy, John Brougham, and Laura Keene. Matilda Heron died at the age of 46 on 7 March 1877 at her New York City home a few weeks after an unsuccessful operation to halt hemorrhoidal bleeding. Her reported last words were "Tilly never did harm to anyone - poor Tilly is so happy."

After services at the Episcopal Church of the Transfiguration (the "Little Church around the Corner" beloved by actors" she was buried in Greenwood Cemetery, Brooklyn. Although the "emotional" school of acting Matilda Heron initiated had other followers, notably Clara Morris and, for a time, Laura Keene, it quickly became dated. Yet in her naturalistic performances, Miss Heron contributed to the transition from the traditional romantic acting of the nineteenth century to the twentieth century realism exemplified by such figures as Minnie Maddern Fiske.

== Critical reception ==
Heron's interpretation was seen as particularly American, since it fit an image of robust, vigorous, and unyielding strength compared to her frail, proper European counterparts. Indeed, Americans hoped to find in Matilda Heron an actress of their own national spirit who could gain international attention and fame. Although Matilda Heron's acting was too rough an unpolished to be seriously considered foreign to critics, she was the pride of American audiences. In response to her New York debut, the New York Daily Tribune reported that "she gave proof…that America has artists—and one whose name is to be written in distinct letters in the history and biography of the drama" (23 January 1857). Matilda Heron was unable to sustain over time the "electricity" originally projected in her interpretation. Her vitality and magnetic effect diminished since she had no technique to keep the internal truth of her acting spontaneous. As the role was repeated and as she lost some of her physical and emotional power, her life on stage became tiresome, both for herself and the audience. Matilda Heron's reliance on quirky inspiration proved to be her downfall as an artist. Adam Badeau who witnessed Heron's Camille many times, reported that "she changes her execution too much; sometimes she omits fine touches, slurs over to-night what last night was most carefully portrayed, or makes wonderfully vivid what to-morrow may seem of less account." Badeau observed that she occasionally lost control of her voice and that her elocution was far from perfect. He took note too of a lack of "anatomical control of muscles and limbs." Despite his criticism, Badeau acknowledged that there was considerable advantage to Matilda Heron's lack of technique. He wrote that "Miss Heron is not the calm, collected self-possessed woman that aperfect artist is; but though she has more blemishes for that, she has some greater excellence for the same reason." Badeau was referring to Heron's power of concentration, her native instinct, and emotional spontaneity that reached from the stage and into an audience. Her unstudied, raw and undisciplined performance was the essence of her style.

In explanation of her popularity, Tice Miller writes that "[s]he exhibited a style of emotional acting which seemed real to the audiences of her day." Henry Clapp, Jr. was greatly impressed by Heron's use of the "emotional school" of acting. According to Charles Bailey Seymour, Heron learned this approach from Mr. H. H. Davis. He saw her performance of Camille multiple times because, as Clapp explains, "she puts so much of herself into it--so much of her strong, impulsive, irrepressible genius--that she could no more play it exactly the same way two consecutive evenings than she could be exactly the same person two consecutive evenings." Edward G. P. Wilkins disagreed with Clapp and criticized Heron's performance in Camille as "a high pressure first-class Western steamboat, with all her fires up, extra pounds of steam to the square inch. The effect is fine, but the danger of an explosion is imminent."

== Original works and translations ==
Besides being an actress, Matilda Heron was also a writer and translator of plays. She translated the play La Dame aux Camélias into English and renamed her translation Camille. The play premiered in New York in January 1857 with Heron in the titular role. She starred alongside Edward Askew Sothern, who played the role of Armand Duval.

Among her other translations are Medea, an English translation of Ernest Legouvé's Medée which is a French adaptation of the story of Medea, and Phaedra, an English translation of Jean Racine's Phèdre. Heron appeared in both plays as the titular roles. In Medea, Heron again acted alongside Edward Askew Sothern who played the role of Jason.

Some of Matilda Heron's original works include Lesbia, Mathilde, Gamea, the Hebrew Mother, Duel in the Days of Richelieu, and The Pearl of the Palais Royal.

Around 1860 to 1861, Heron wrote The Belle of the Season and starred in it as the character Florence Upperton at the Winter Garden. The play was originally called New Year's Eve, but the name was changed to The Belle of the Season for the play's premiere in New York.

Despite her extensive work on other plays, including her original works, the only role and play that Heron received great recognition for was Camille.
