= Bijou Heron =

American actress (1863–1937)

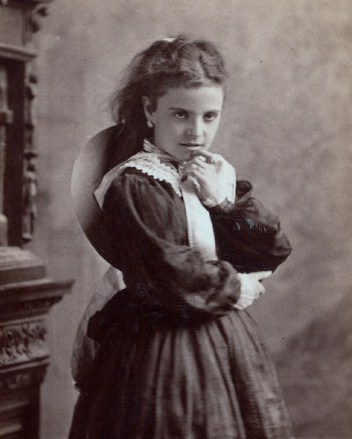
- Born: Helene Wallace Stoepel; September 1, 1863; New York City, U.S.
- Died: March 18, 1937 (aged 73); New York City, U.S.
- Other name: Mrs. Henry Miller
- Occupation: Stage actress
- Spouse: Henry Miller (m. 1883)
- Children: 3, including Gilbert Miller
- Parent(s): Robert Stoepel (father); Matilda Heron (mother)

Helene Wallace Stoepel (September 1, 1863 – March 18, 1937), known professionally as Bijou Heron, was an American stage actress, who became famous as a child actor in the 1870s.

== Biography ==
Helene Wallace Stoepel was born in New York City to the German composer and orchestra conductor Robert Stoepel and the Irish-American actress Matilda Heron. She was introduced to audiences at the age of six in a production of Medea at the Bowery Theater where her mother played the title role.

In 1873, she joined the Augustin Daly company at the Fifth Avenue Theatre and took on the stage name Bijou Heron. Her first leading role was in Monsieur Alphonse, a dramatic adaptation of a novel by Alexandre Dumas. The following season she received critical acclaim for her portrayal of Oliver in Oliver Twist. The cast included actors Fanny Davenport, Charles Fisher, and James Lewis. In 1876, she joined the A. M. Palmer Company at the Union Square Theatre. She played in Miss Multon with Clara Morris and portrayed Smike an adaptation of Nicholas Nickleby. She toured with this company, playing for three months in San Francisco. Upon returning to New York, she was asked to take the place of actress Sara Jewett in A Celebrated Case starring Charles Coghlan. She later appeared in The School for Scandal with Coghlan, John Parcelle, Harry Crisp and Ann Gilbert.

Heron moved to England after the death of her mother in 1877. There she was seen in several productions at the Court Theatre in London with Maurice Barrymore and Arthur Cecil. She toured England with the actor and dramatist Dion Boucicault. After returning to New York, she rejoined Daly's company. Heron played in Odette opposite the actor and producer Henry Miller, whom she married February 1, 1883, in New York. The Millers performed and toured with C.W. Couldock in Hazel Kirke under the management of Daniel Frohman. They later joined the Clara Morris company.

They had three children: theatrical producer Gilbert Heron Miller, actor and director John Heron Miller (aka Henry Miller, Jr.) and Agnes Heron Miller, actress and first wife of entertainer Tim McCoy.

Heron died March 18, 1937, at her home in New York City and was buried in Green-Wood Cemetery in Brooklyn, New York.
