= A Young Woman Reading (Vermeer imitator) =

Painting by in the manner of Johannes Vermeer

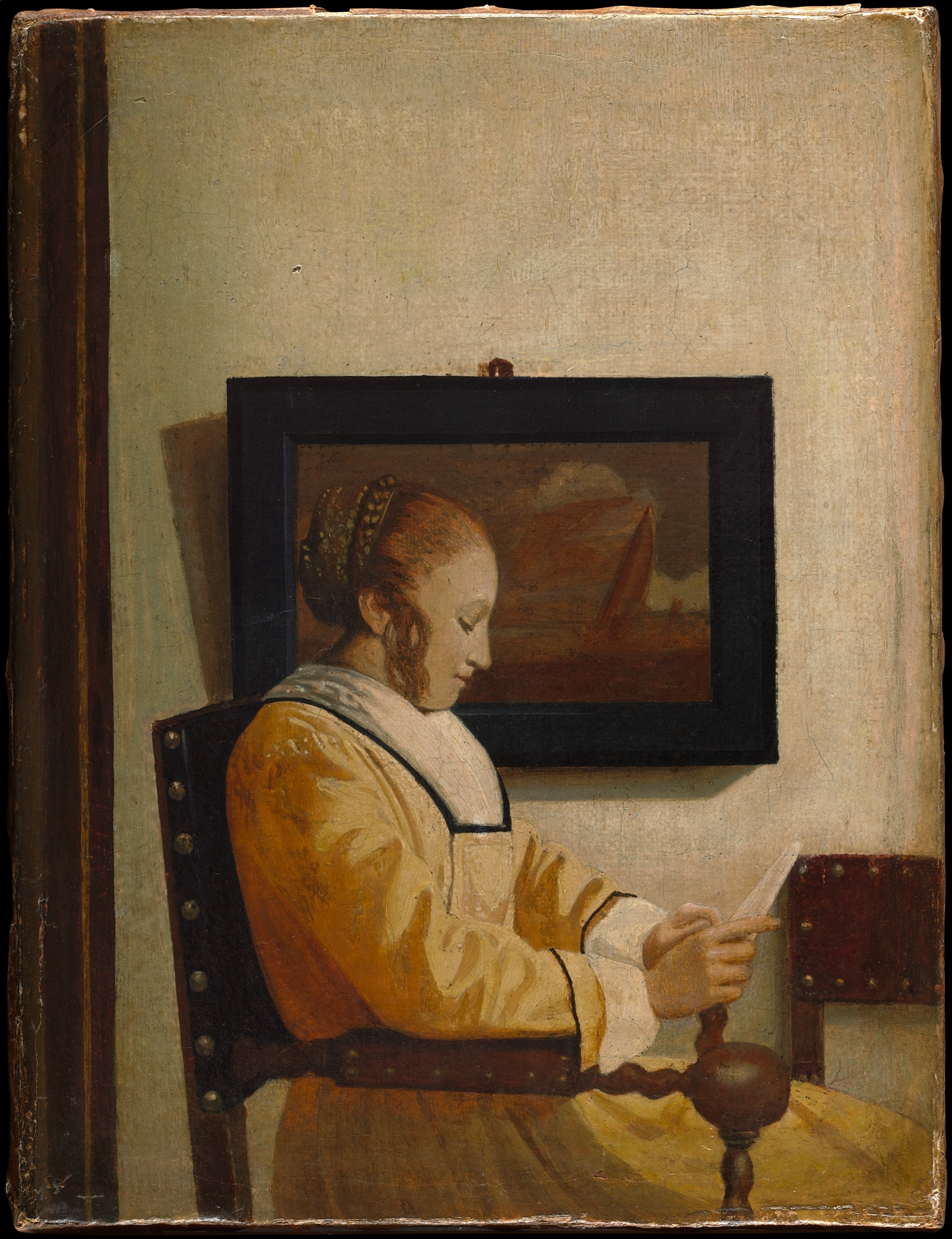
- Artist: Unknown in the manner of Johannes Vermeer
- Year: 1920s
- Medium: oil paint, canvas
- Dimensions: 19.7 cm (7.8 in) × 14.6 cm (5.7 in)
- Location: Metropolitan Museum of Art
- Owner: Jules Bache
- Accession: 49.7.40

A Young Woman Reading (after 1670s) is an oil on canvas painting by an unknown painter in the manner of the Dutch painter Johannes Vermeer. It is an example of Dutch Golden Age painting and is part of the collection of the Metropolitan Museum of Art.

== Description ==
This painting by a follower of Vermeer was purchased by Jules Bache as autograph for $134,800 in 1928, and he left it to the museum (as autograph) in 1949.

Years later it became apparent that it was a modern forgery, but the attribution to Han van Meegeren is uncertain. Bache had purchased it from Wildenstein & Company who had acquired it from dr. G.A. Rademaker of The Hague. Bache had previously purchased two other old master paintings for similar prices which he subsequently left to the museum:

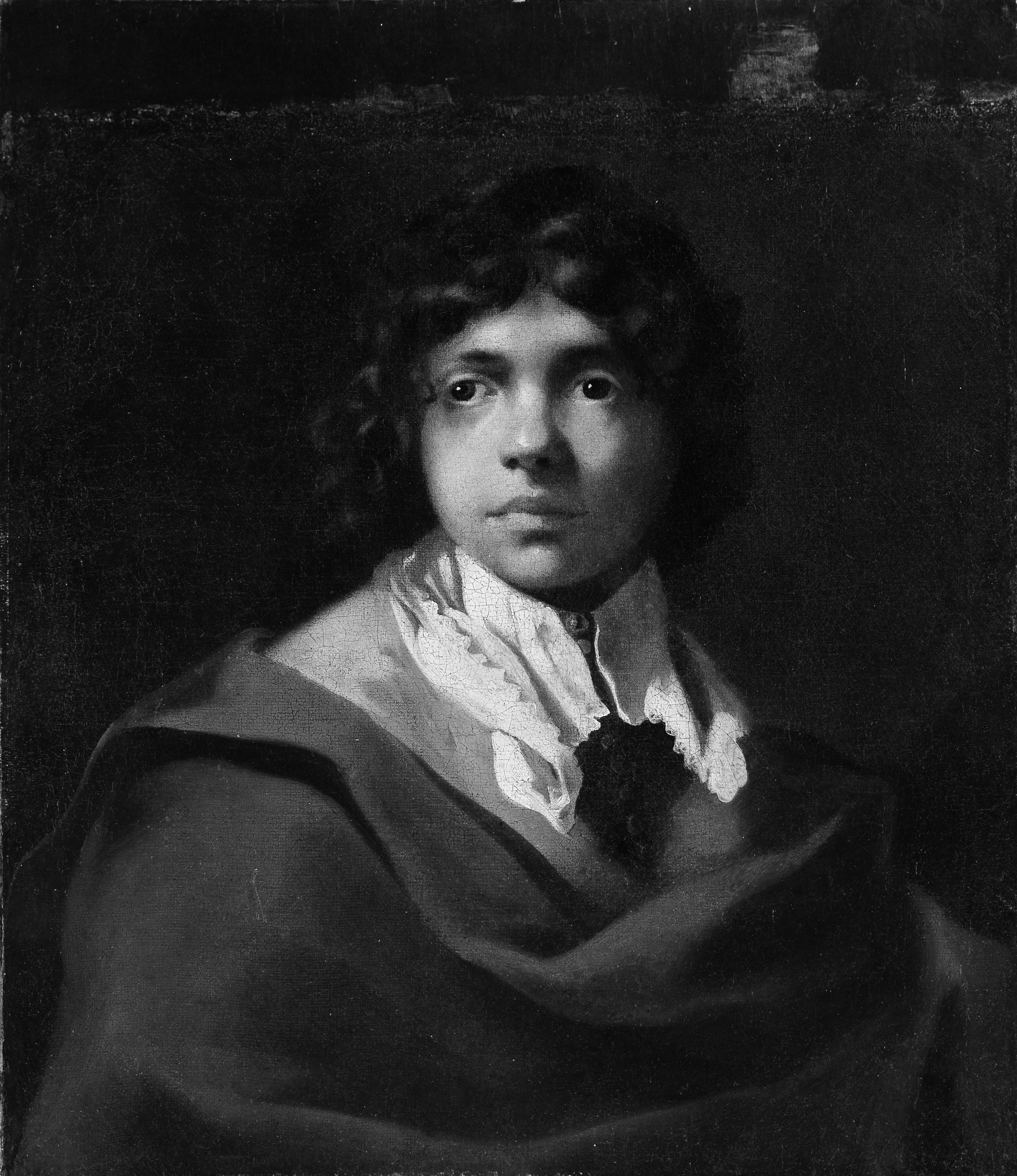
Purchased for $175,000 in 1925 as a Vermeer, but since attributed to Sebastian Bourdon

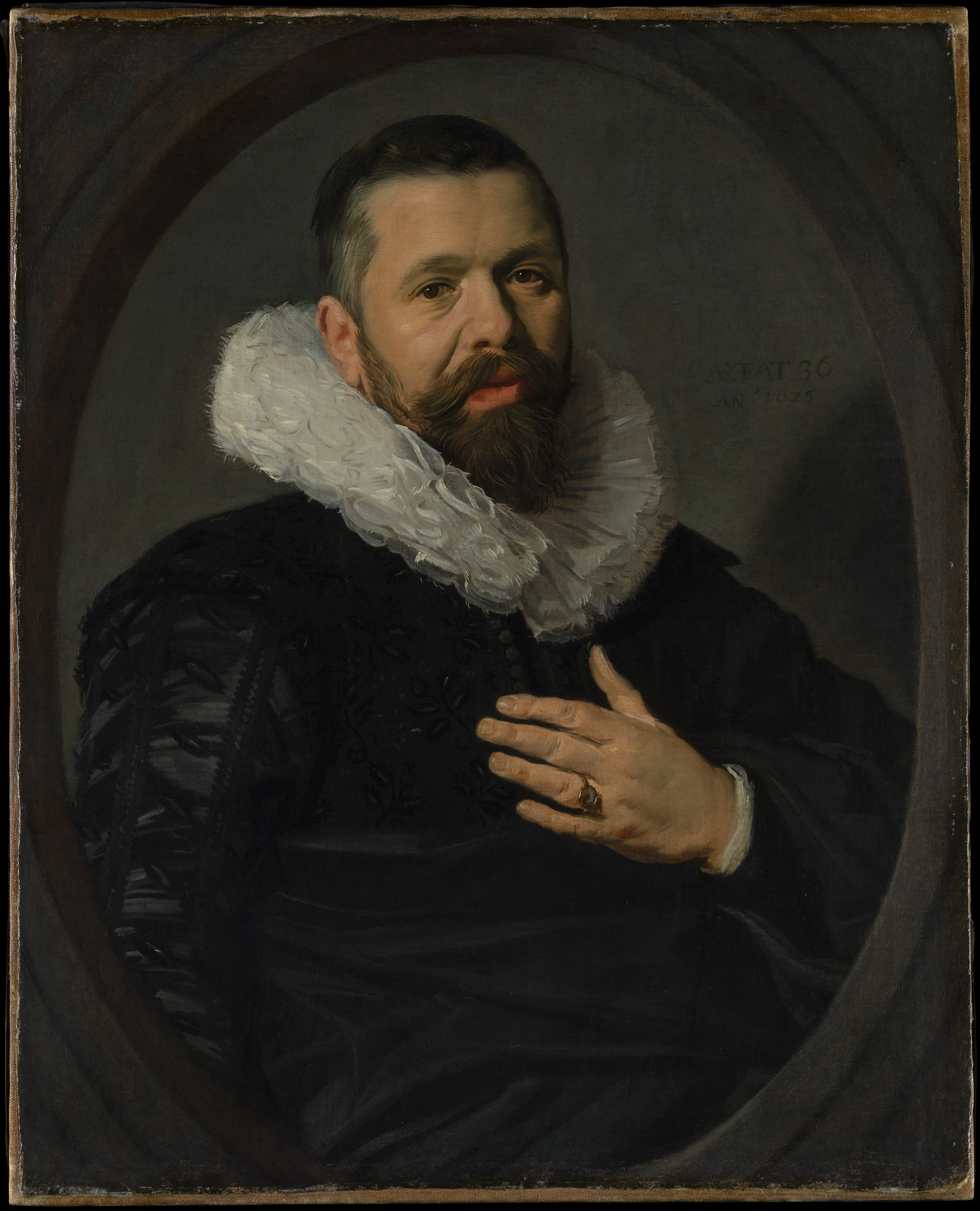
Purchased for $121,176.25 in 1926 as a Hals

Like A Lady Playing the Guitar, the painting is a quiet witness to the popularity of Vermeer among the US art collectors of the early 20th-century. The attribution was called into question by W.R. Valentiner soon after the Dutch art collector and critic Vitale Bloch published an article about it in 1928. Bloch mentioned that the seascape was similar to the Love Letter and the head was similar to Girl Reading a Letter at an Open Window. What he saw as proof of authenticity was interpreted by Valentiner to be cause for concern, especially since "to hear almost every year of a newly discovered Vermeer may cause suspicion".
