= Portrait of a Man (Velázquez) =

Painting by Diego Velazquez

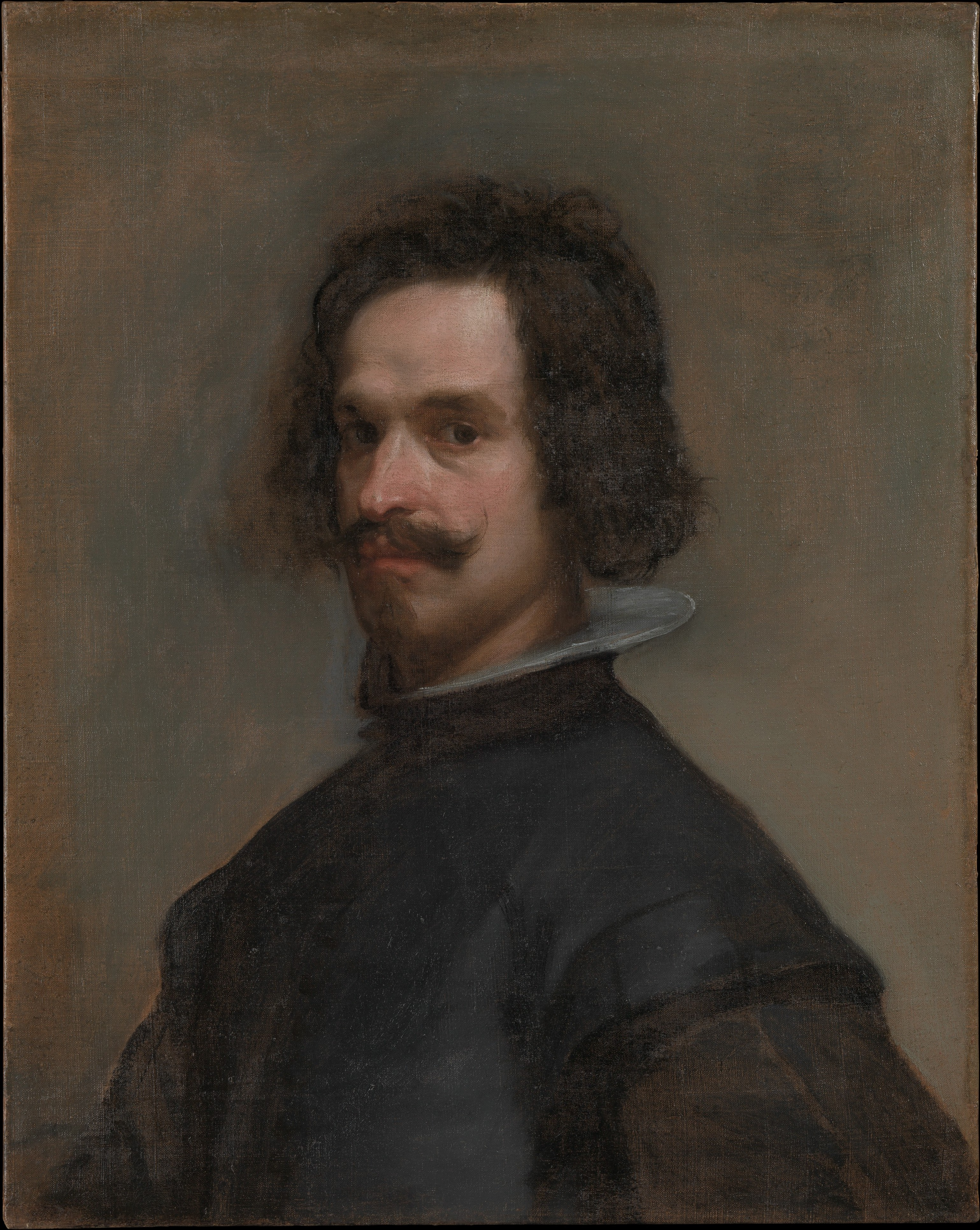
- Artist: Diego Velázquez
- Year: c. 1630–1635
- Type: Oil painting
- Location: Metropolitan Museum of Art
- Accession: 49.7.42

Portrait of a Man is an oil painting by Diego Velázquez, measuring 68.6 × 55.2 cm (27 × 21 3/4 in.), the frame is from Northern Spain and painted c. 1630–1635. The painting is in the collection of the Metropolitan Museum of Art in New York City. Long the subject of uncertainty regarding its authorship, Portrait of a Man was in 2009 re-attributed to Diego Velázquez.

== History ==
Portrait of a Man once belonged to Count Johann Ludwig, Reichsgraf von Wallmoden-Gimborn, the illegitimate son of George II of Great Britain. The painting was subsequently owned by Joseph Duveen, who sold it to Jules Bache in 1926 for $1.125 million, with the understanding that it was a genuine Velázquez. Bache bequeathed the painting to the Metropolitan Museum in 1949. Darkened and discolored by varnish, the painting was restored and cleaned in 1953 and again in 1965, yet was in the 1960s attributed by a scholar as painted by the workshop of Velázquez, a judgment with which the museum concurred in 1979.

In 2009, as a result of its most recent cleaning by Michael Gallagher of the museum's conservation department, murky, greenish tones were revealed to be gray, and fine details of brushwork and a long-obscured vibrancy of color were discovered, leading the museum to restore the traditional attribution to Velázquez. In the words of art historian Jonathan Brown, a leading authority on Velázquez, "One glance was all it took....The picture has been under my nose all my life. It's a fantastic discovery. It suddenly emerges Cinderella-like."

== Subject matter ==
The painting was painted from life with an informal handling, and Duveen may have had it retouched to appear more "old masterish". The portrait closely resembles that of a figure at the far right of Surrender of Breda, also by Velázquez, which was painted to memorialize a victory by Spain over the Dutch. It is possible, though uncertain, that both portraits are self-representations of the artist.

== See also ==
- List of works by Diego Velázquez
