= Kathryn Bache Miller =

American art collector and philanthropist (1896–1979)

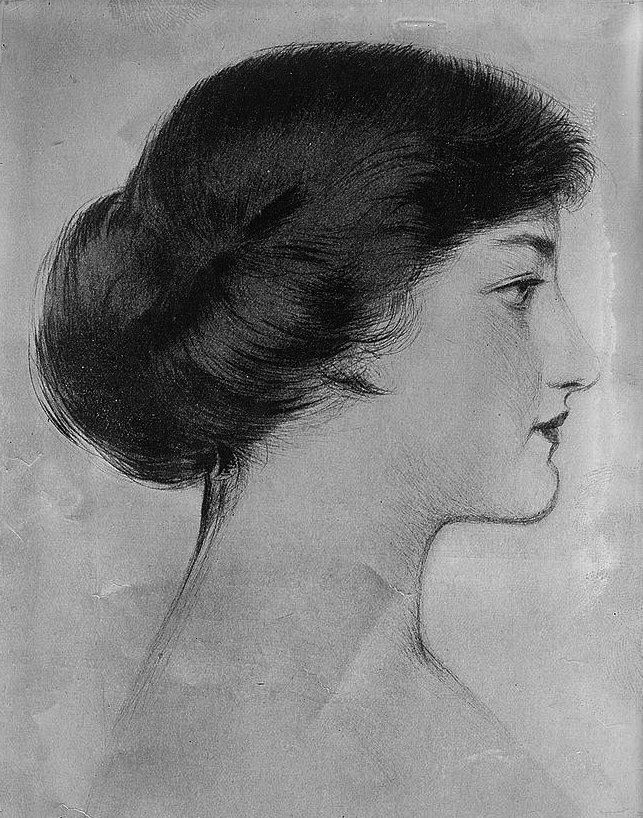
- Bache c. 1910 – c. 1915
- Born: Kathryn Bache; April 19, 1896; New York City
- Died: October 15, 1979 (aged 83); New York City
- Other name: Kitty Bache
- Spouse: Gilbert Miller (m. 1927; died 1969)
- Parent: Jules Bache

Kathryn Bache Miller (April 19, 1896 – October 15, 1979) was an American art collector and philanthropist.

== Early life ==
Bache was born in 1896, she was the daughter of investment banker Jules S. Bache and Florence Rosalie Scheftel (1869–1931). Known to her friends as Kitty. she married 1927 the theatrical producer Gilbert Miller in Paris, France. On February 18, 1916, along with many other debutantes, she performed in the suffrage opera, Melinda and Her Sisters, by Mrs. O. H. P. Belmont and Miss Elsa Maxwell. It was staged in the grand ballroom of the Waldorf–Astoria.

== Goya's Red Boy ==
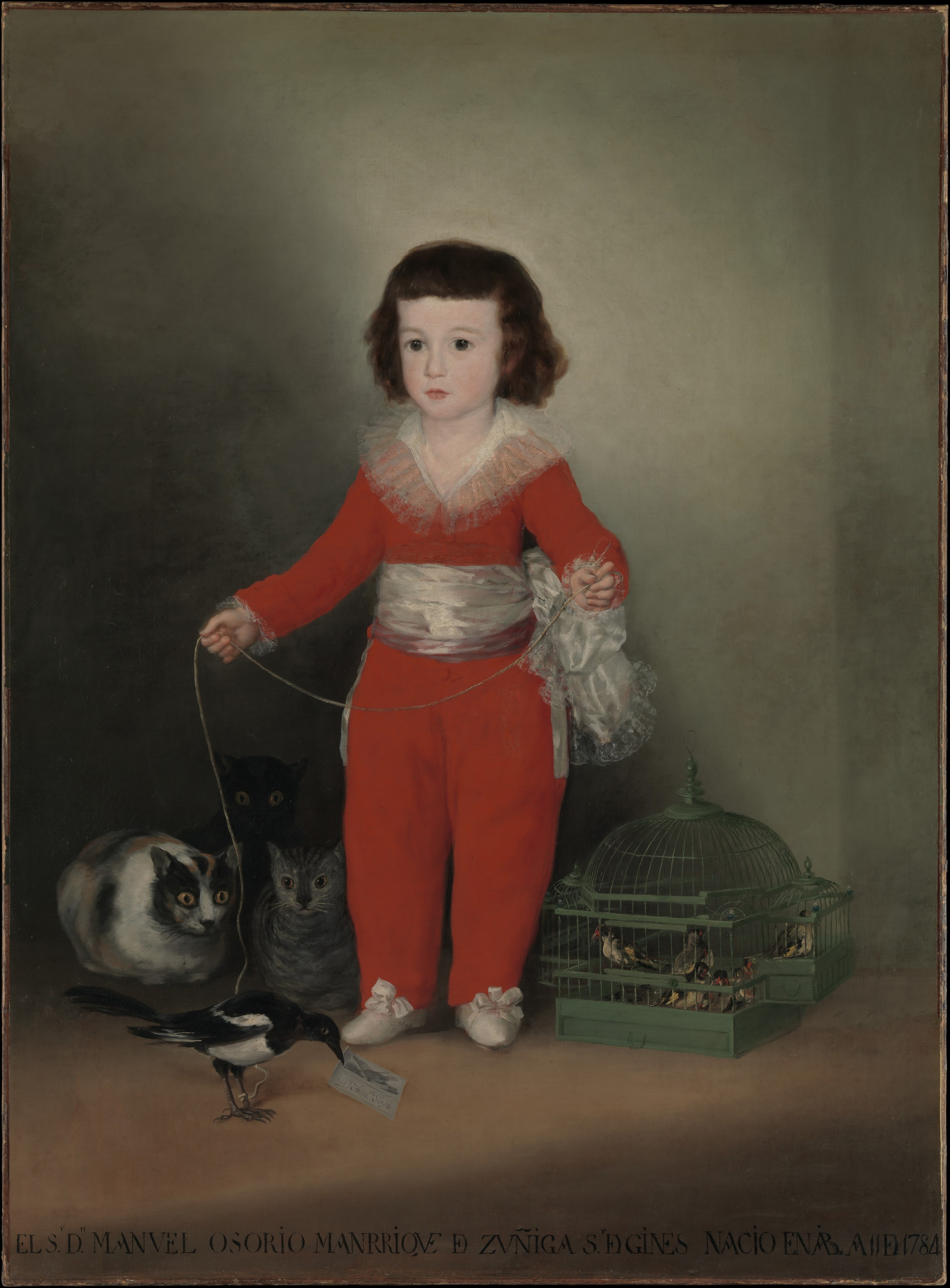
Manuel Osorio Manrique de Zúñiga ("Red Boy"), 1787–88, by Goya

In 1926, while in Paris at the art gallery of Joseph Duveen, she fell in love with the painting by Francisco Goya, Manuel Osorio Manrique de Zuñiga, commonly known as the "Red Boy". Her father then purchased it for $275,000. The painting was hung prominently in her living room. Her interior decorator, Billy Baldwin, described her attachment to it as if it were a living being. Her father bequeathed the painting to the Metropolitan Museum of Art, but it was allowed to be shown periodically in Miller's apartment until she died in 1979.

== Marriage ==
On July 16, 1927, she married Gilbert Miller, a theatrical producer, in Paris, France. Her father had been initially against the marriage, but then changed his mind. He helped the guests celebrate with a wedding breakfast at his Paris apartment, which held his vast collection of antiques and art works. Her apartment at 550 Park Avenue in New York City was decorated by Billy Baldwin.

== Later life ==
A well-dressed society figure, she became a permanent member of the Fashion Hall of Fame, class of 1965, along with Jacqueline Kennedy Onassis. She was a close friend of the Duchess of Windsor and Truman Capote.

== Philanthropy ==
She was known for having lavish New Year's Eve parties that supported charities. In particular, she supported Roosevelt Hospital with millions of dollars.

== Legacy ==
On April 17, 1980, her estate was sold at auction by Christie's. In 1983 the Italian Baroque painting of St John the Baptist Preaching by Mattia Preti was purchased partially with funds from the Kathryn Bache Miller Fund for the Legion of Honor museum in California.

In 1988, the Miller Theatre at Columbia University was named in her honor.
