= Auburn hair =

Human hair colour

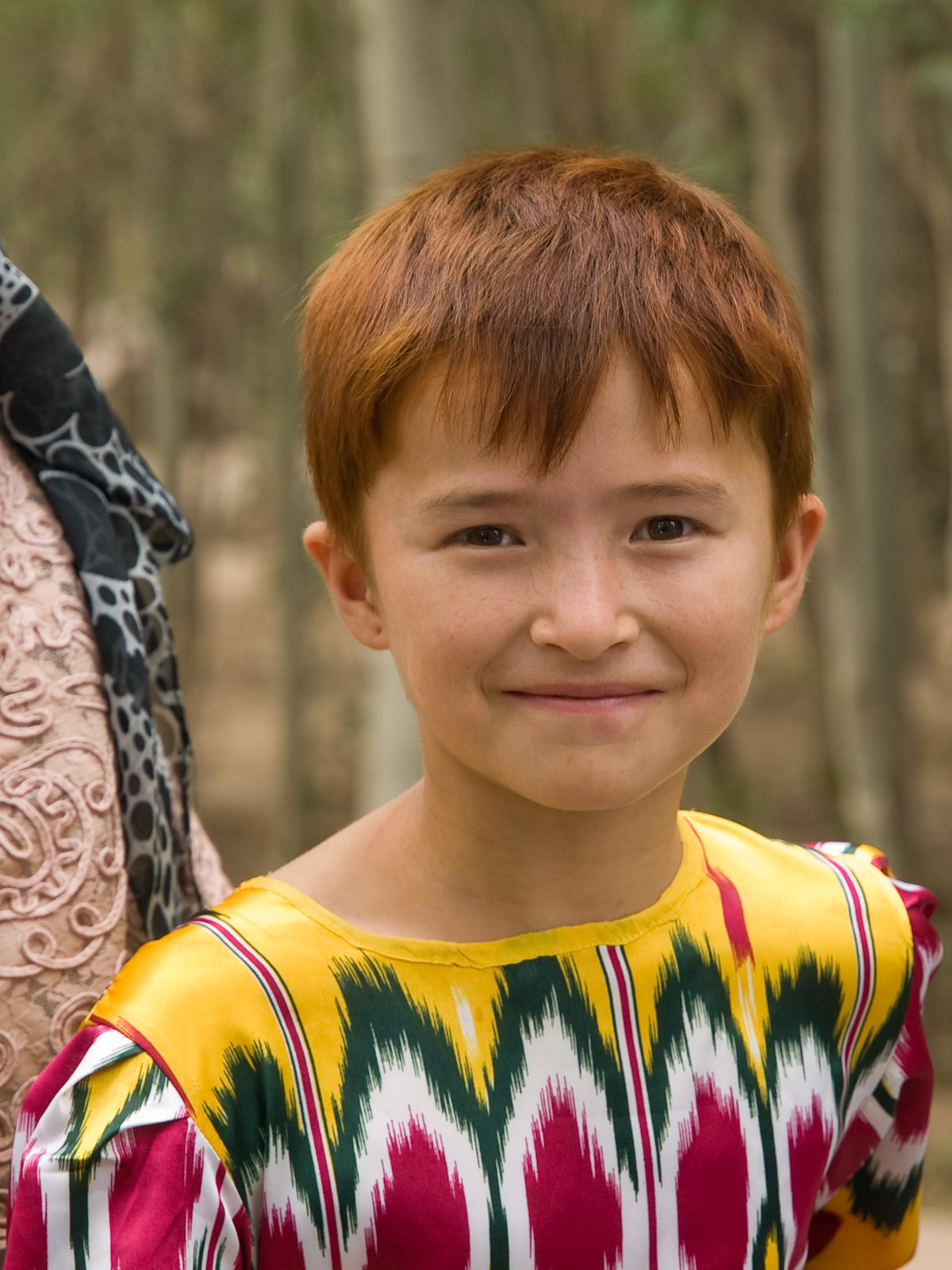
A Uyghur child in Kashgar, China's Xinjiang region, with auburn hair

Auburn hair is a human hair color, a variety of red hair, most commonly described as reddish-brown in color. Auburn hair ranges in shades from medium to dark. It can be found with a wide array of skin tones and eye colors. The chemical pigments that cause the coloration of auburn hair are often pheomelanin with high levels of eumelanin.

== Differentiation ==
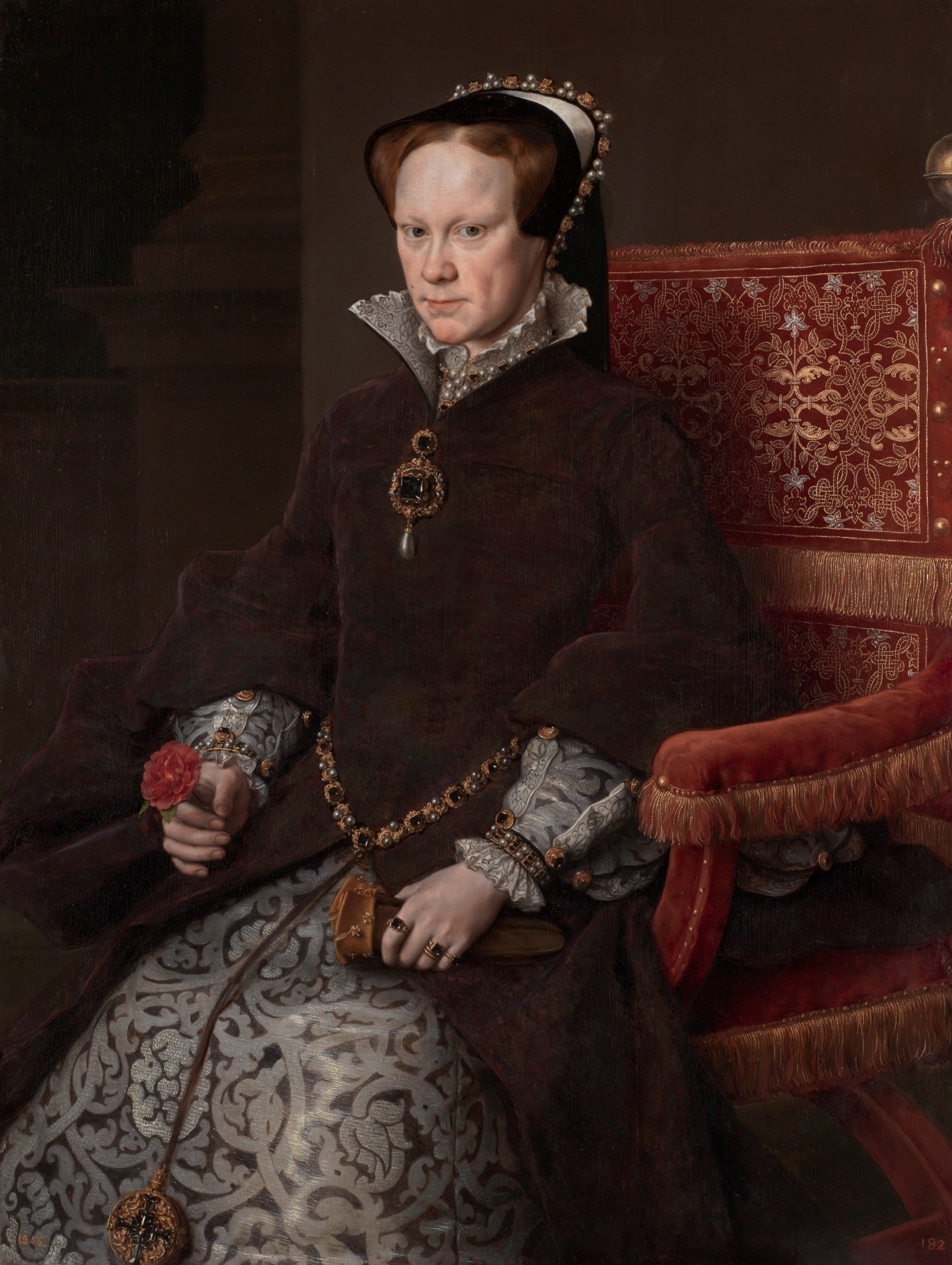
Queen Mary I of England was described with either light or dark auburn hair.

"Auburn" can be used to describe many shades of reddish hair with similar definitions or hues. It is often conflated in popular usage with Titian hair. Whereas Titian hair is a brownish shade of red hair, auburn hair is specifically defined as including the actual color red. Most definitions of Titian hair describe it as a brownish-orange color, but some describe it as being reddish. This is in reference to red hair itself, not the color red.

Auburn encompasses the color maroon, but so too do chestnut and burgundy. In contrast with the two, auburn is more red in color, whereas chestnut is more brown, and burgundy is more purple; chestnut hair is also often referred to as "chestnut-brown".

== Etymology ==
The word "auburn" comes from the Old French word alborne, which meant blond, coming from Latin word alburnus ("off-white"). The first recorded use of auburn in English was in 1430. The word was sometimes corrupted into abram, for example in early (pre-1685) folios of Coriolanus, Thomas Kyd's Soliman and Perseda (1588) and Thomas Middleton's Blurt, Master Constable (1601).

== Geographic distribution ==
Auburn hair is common among people of northern and western European descent, but it is less common elsewhere. Auburn hair occurs most frequently in Scandinavia (Denmark, Norway and Sweden), Britain, Ireland, continental Germanic Europe (Germany, Austria, the Netherlands), northern France, Poland and Russia. This hair color is less common further south and southeast. Due to independent mutation and admixture, it can also be found in other parts of the world such as North America, South America, Oceania, South Africa, Siberia, etc.

== See also ==
- Blond hair
