= Self-portrait (van Dyck, New York) =

Painting by Anthony van Dyck

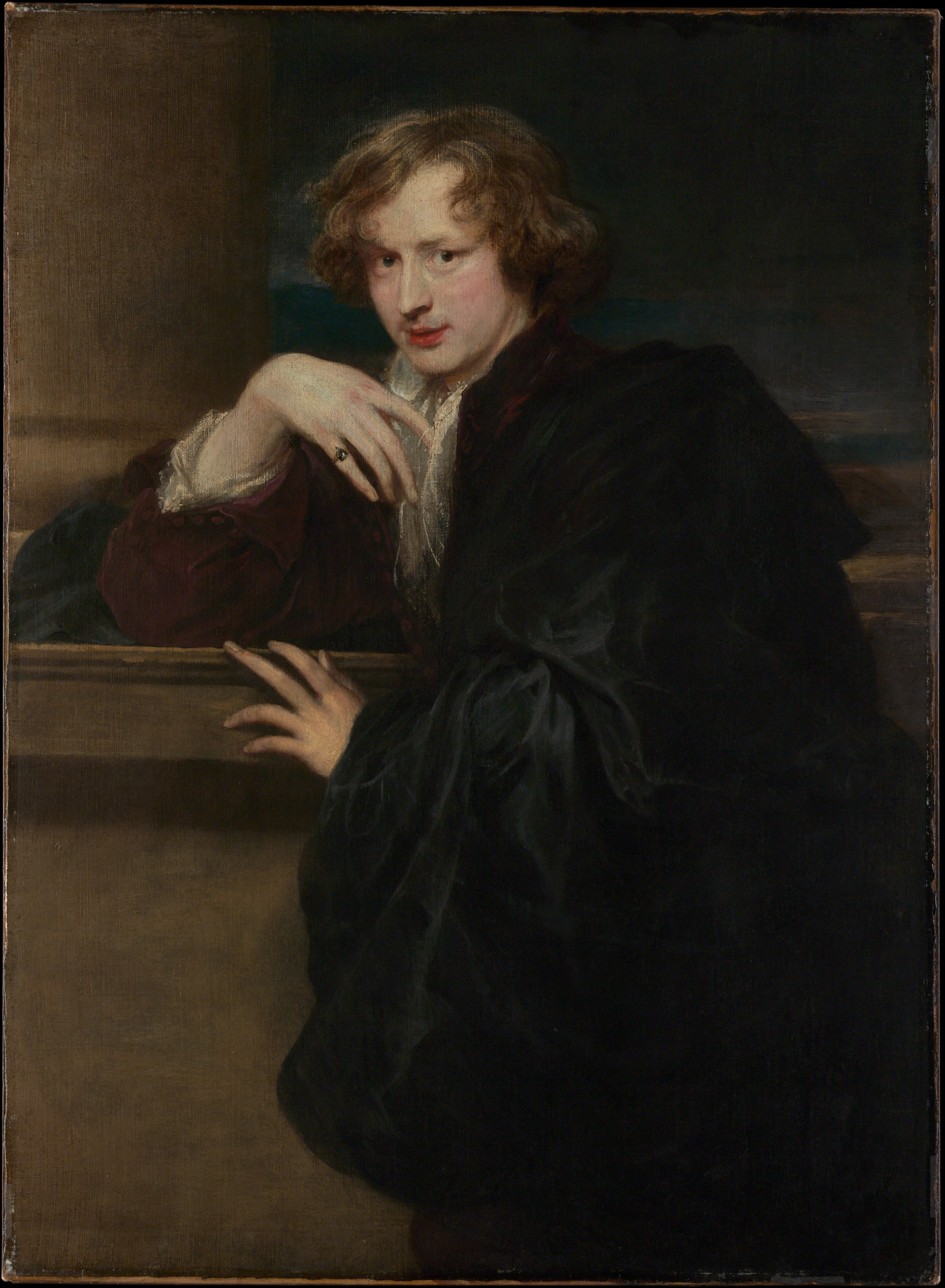
- Self-portrait
- Artist: Anthony van Dyck
- Year: 1620–1621
- Medium: Oil on canvas
- Subject: Anthony van Dyck
- Dimensions: 119.7 cm × 87.9 cm (47.1 in × 34.6 in)
- Location: Metropolitan Museum of Art; New York

The Self-portrait is an oil on canvas painting by the Flemish artist Anthony van Dyck. It is held at the Metropolitan Museum of Art, in New York. The work depicts its creator during his early twenties.

== Description ==
The self-portrait was probably painted by van Dyck during the winter of 1620–1621, which the artist spent in London. Van Dyck chose to portray himself as a country gentlemen dressed in fine clothes; he likely acquired these clothes due to his father being a wealthy clothier.

The painting was donated to the Metropolitan Museum by the American banker Jules Bache in 1949.

== See also ==
- List of paintings by Anthony van Dyck
