= Manuel Osorio Manrique de Zúñiga =

Painting by Francisco Goya

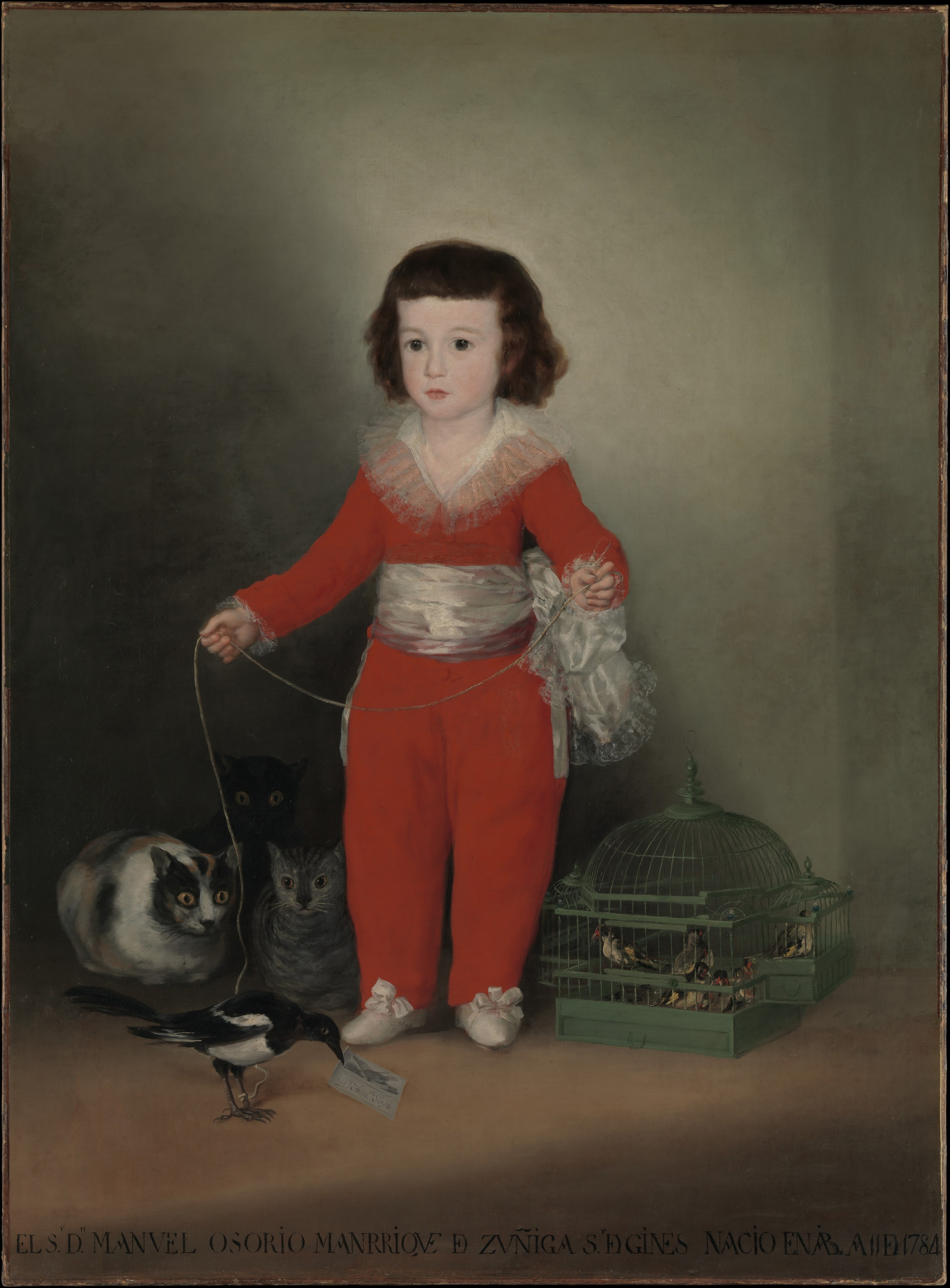
- Artist: Francisco Goya
- Year: 1787–1788
- Medium: Oil on canvas
- Dimensions: 127 cm × 101.6 cm (50 in × 40.0 in)
- Location: Metropolitan Museum of Art; New York

Manuel Osorio Manrique de Zúñiga is a large full-length portrait in oil painted in 1787–88 by the Spanish artist Francisco Goya. It depicts a boy three or four years of age, standing in red clothes, with birds and cats. It is also known as Goya's "Red Boy". It was described by art historian Claus Virch in 1967 as "one of the most appealing and successful portraits of children ever painted, and also one of the most famous". The painting has been held by the Metropolitan Museum of Art, in New York, since 1949.

== History ==
The painting was commissioned by the boy's father, Vicente Joaquín Osorio de Moscoso y Guzmán (1756–1816), conde de Altamira, who held many titles and was also a director of the Banco de San Carlos. Altamira was one of the six dignitaries of the newly formed Banco de San Carlos painted by Goya between 1785 and 1788. In 1786, after painting several portraits of the court, Goya was nominated painter to Charles III, and continued from 1789 as court painter of his successor Charles IV.

Altamira hired Goya to paint several family portraits. This painting, from 1787–88, depicts Altimira's youngest son, Manuel, who was born in April 1784 and died at age eight on June 12, 1792. Goya also painted a portrait of another of Altamira's four sons, Vicente Isabel Osorio de Moscoso y Álvarez de Toledo (1777–1837), and of his wife María Ignacia Álvarez de Toledo y Gonzaga, the condesa de Altamira (1757–1795) with their infant daughter, María Agustina (born 1787).

== Description ==
Manuel is dressed in a red silk costume with white collar and cuffs, silver satin sash, and white shoes decorated with bows. He holds a string attached to his pet magpie, with Goya's visiting card in its beak. To Manuel's left is a cage of finches, while three cats are intently watching the magpie on his right. The boy's pale face and bright costume contrast against the drab olive-brown background.

== Analysis ==
The pets in this portrait have been analysed in many different ways. The caged birds may symbolize the innocent soul, the cats may be an evil force. For example, Goya shows a cat among the creatures in The Sleep of Reason Produces Monsters, part of The Caprices.

== Legacy ==
The painting was hung with other family portraits at Altamira's palace in Madrid. It was auctioned in Paris in 1878 for 1,200 francs, and then acquired by the playwright Henri Bernstein before 1903. Bernstein based parts of the stage design for his 1924 play La Galerie des glaces on the painting, and then sold it to the art dealer Joseph Duveen in 1925 for 450,000 francs and £9,000.

In 1926, Kathryn Bache Miller fell in love with this painting while at the Paris art gallery of Joseph Duveen. Her father, Jules Bache, then purchased it for $160,000. The painting was hung prominently in her living room. Her interior decorator, Billy Baldwin, described her attachment to it as if it were a living being. Her father bequeathed the painting to the Metropolitan Museum of Art on his death in 1944, and his estate transferred the painting to the museum in 1949, but it was allowed to be shown periodically in Miller's apartment until she died in 1979.

From April 22 to August 3, 2014, the museum reunited Manuel with his parents in the exhibit Goya and the Altamira Family. The exhibit also included portraits of his two brothers and his sister.

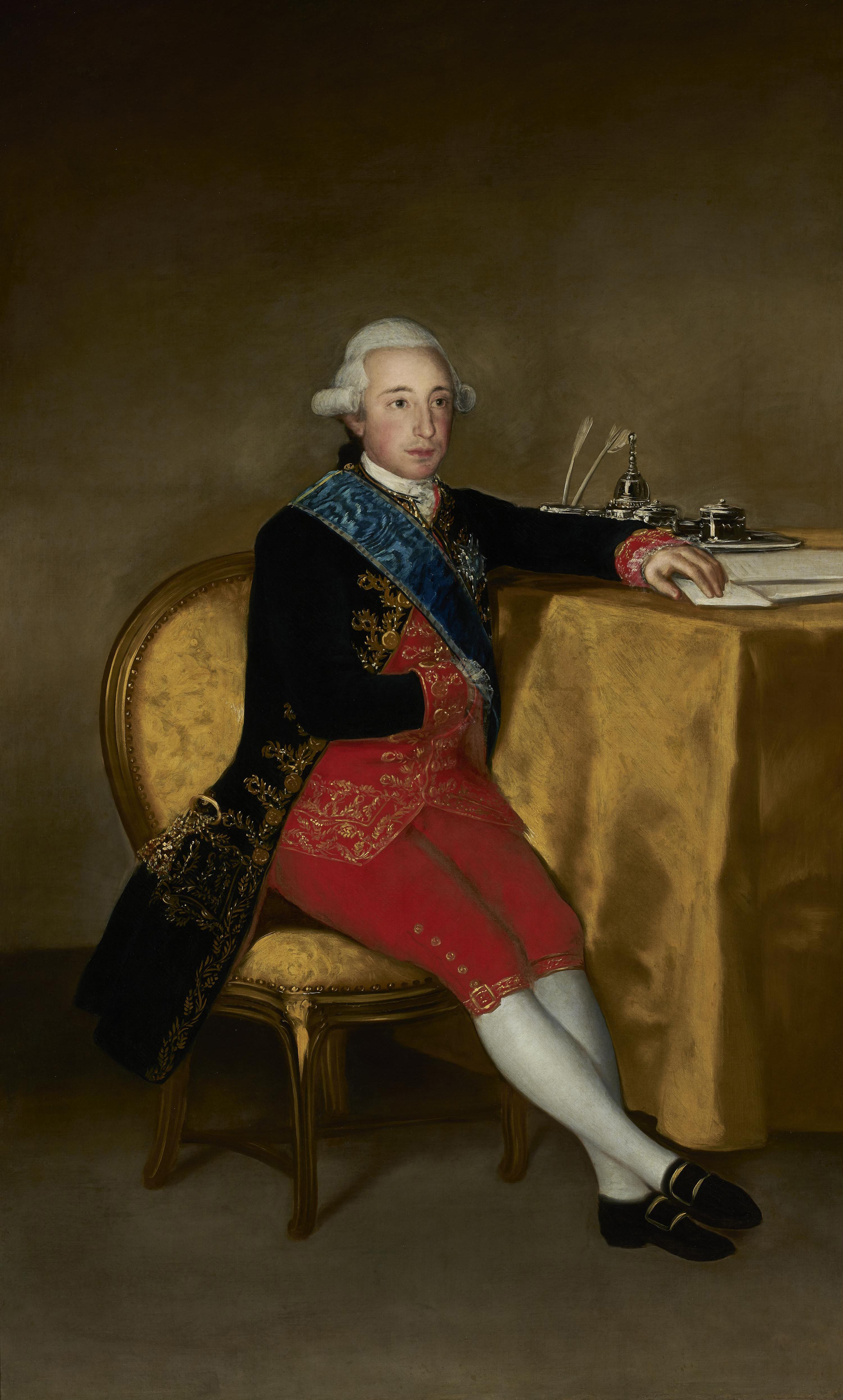
Goya's portrait of Vicente Joaquín Osorio de Moscoso y Guzmán, 1787. Collection of the Bank of Spain.

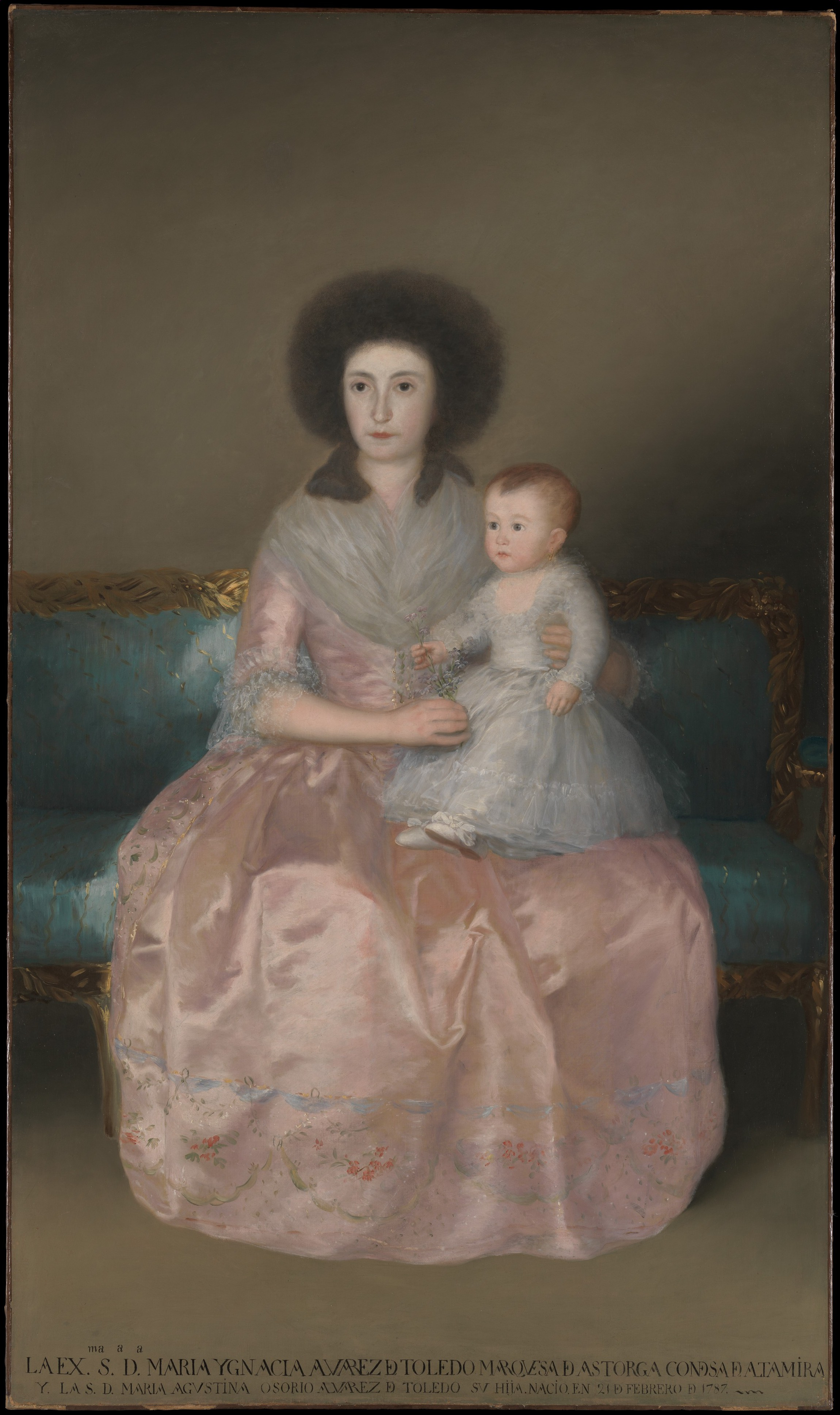
Goya's portrait of the Countess of Altamira and her Daughter, 1787–88. Metropolitan Museum of Art

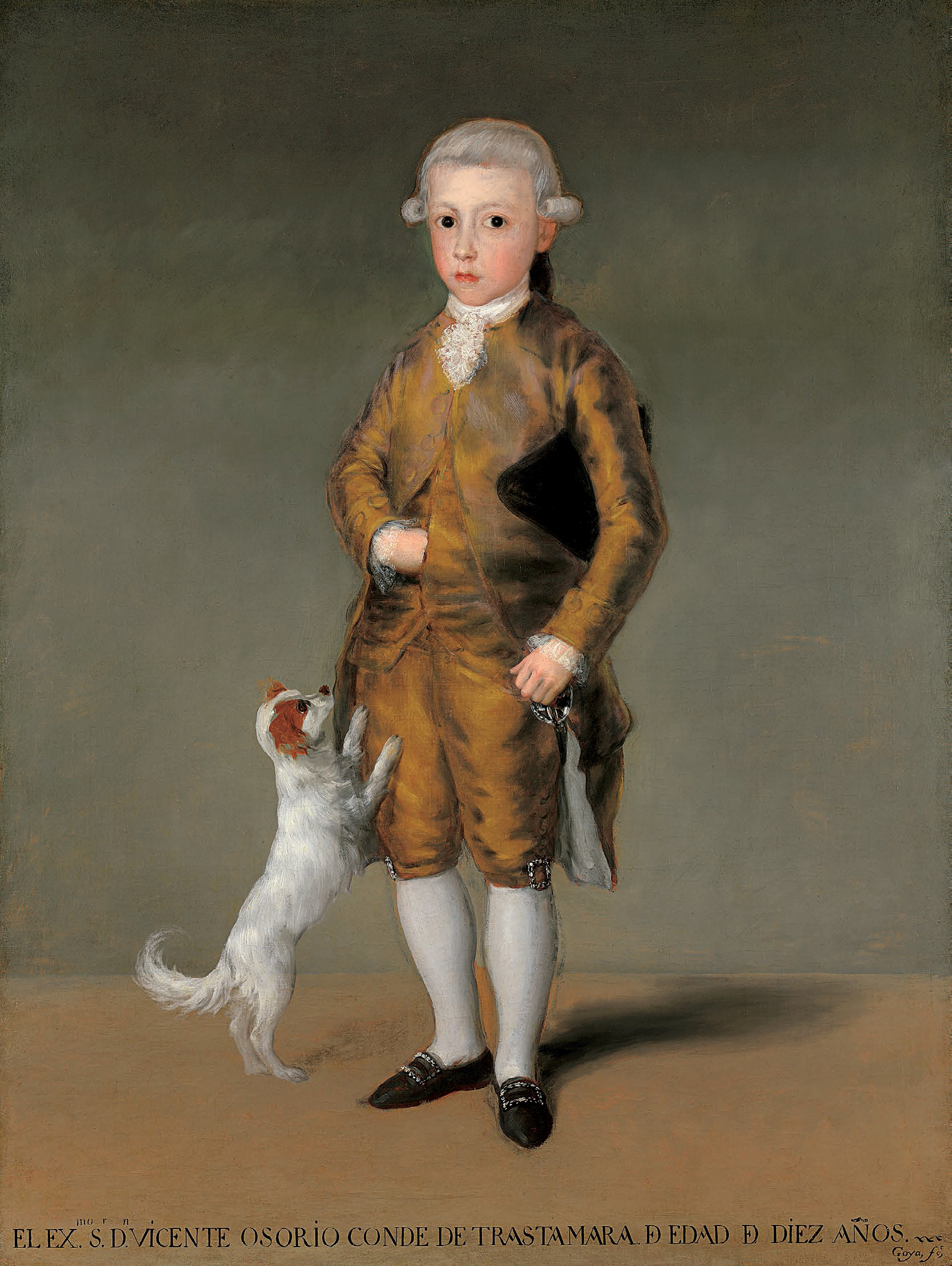
Goya's portrait of Vicente Isabel Osorio de Moscoso, conde de Trastámara, 1786–87, at 9 or 10 years old. Museum of Fine Arts, Houston

== See also ==
- List of works by Francisco Goya

== Bibliography ==
- Salomon, Xavier F. (2014). "Goya and the Altamira Family". The Metropolitan Museum of Art Bulletin (Spring 2014).
