= Jacometto Veneziano =

Italian painter

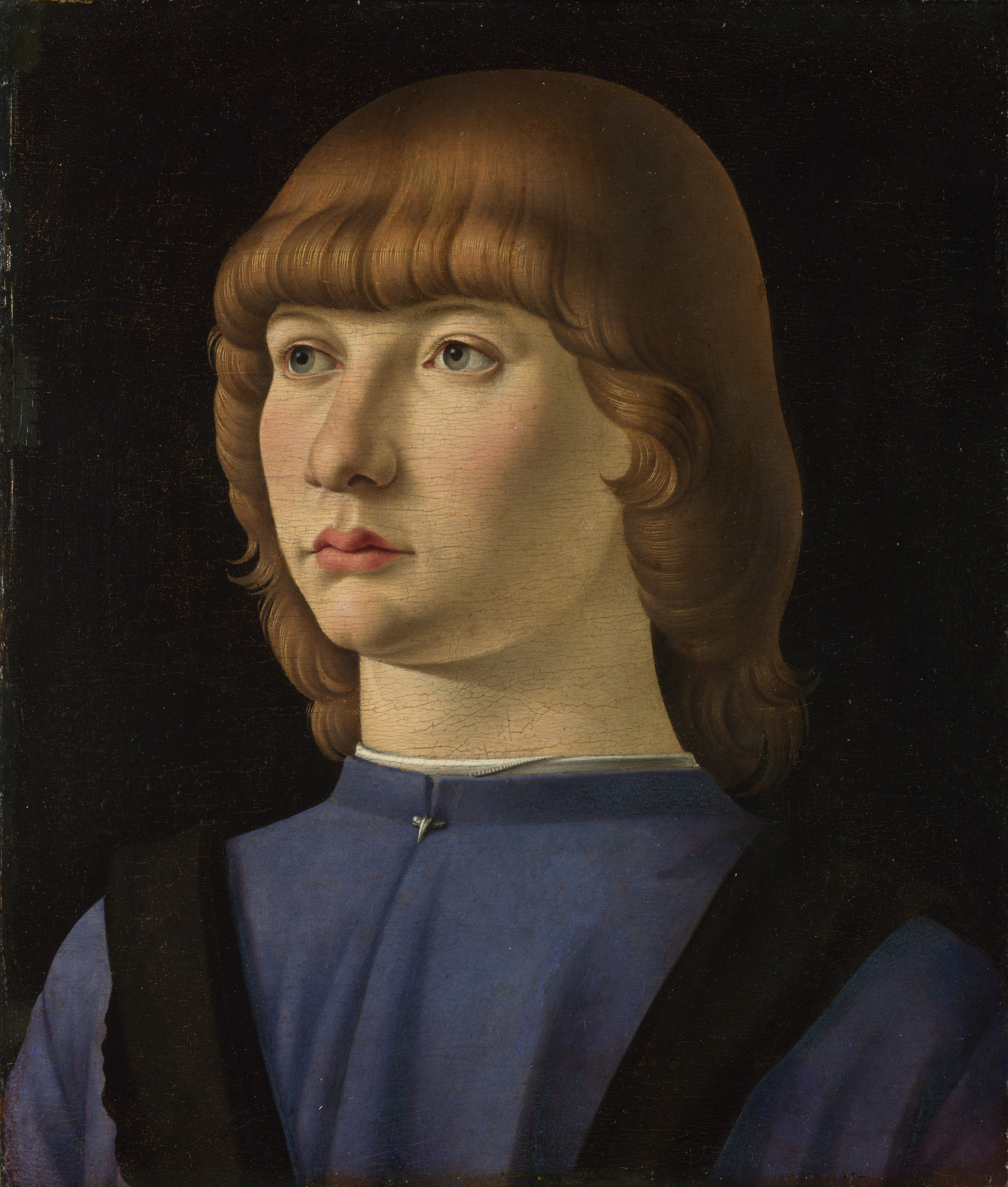
Portrait of a boy

Jacometto Veneziano (active 1472–1497), was an Italian painter and illuminator.

== Biography ==
The information we have about Veneziano is mainly based on the records of the diarist and art collector Marcantonio Michiel.

From the testimony of Michiel it can be concluded that Veneziano was mainly active as a manuscript illuminator and a painter of small-scale panels, the majority of which were portraits.

He died before 10 September 1497.
