= Bache Madonna =

C. 1508 painting by Titian

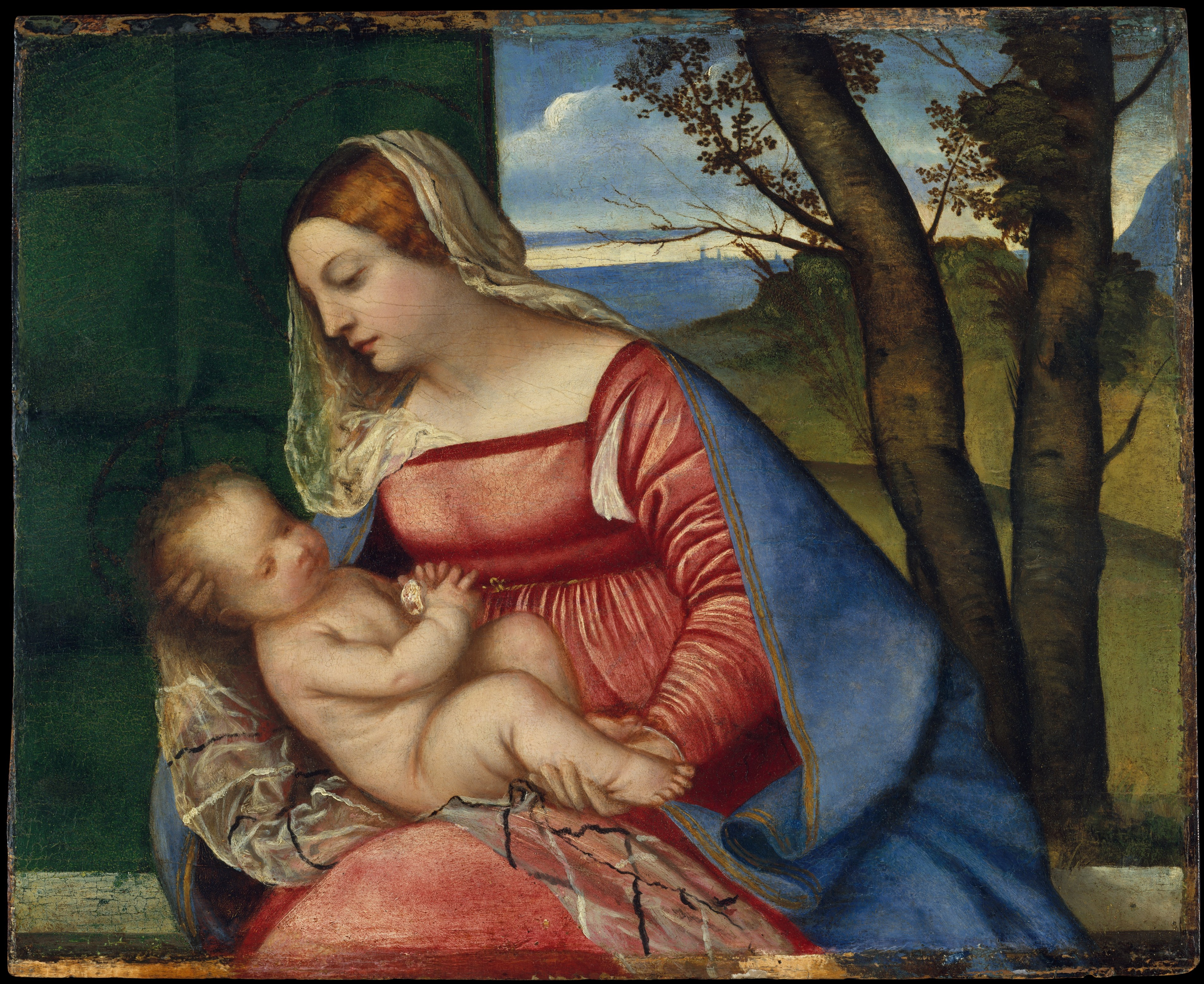
- Artist: Titian
- Completion date: c. 1508
- Type: Painting
- Medium: Oil on panel
- Dimensions: 46 cm × 56 cm (18 in × 22 in)
- Location: Metropolitan Museum of Art, New York
- Accession: 49.7.15

The Bache Madonna or Madonna and Child is an oil painting on wood by Titian, dating to c. 1508 and belonging to his juvenile period, when he was still strongly influenced by Giorgione.

Investigation has suggested that the artist first posed the figures sitting erect in the center of the composition, in the manner of Giovanni Bellini. However, the final pose is more informal, emphasising the tender bond between the mother and her child.

Past cleaning has caused the picture to lose some definition.

== Provenance ==
Its first recorded owner was Jean de Jullienne in Paris around 1756. It was later acquired by Brownlow Cecil, 9th Earl of Exeter, in whose family collection it remained until 1888. It then passed through several private collections before being acquired in 1928 by Jules Bache, after whom it is named. After his death it was acquired by the Metropolitan Museum of Art in New York in 1949, where it now resides.

== Bibliography ==
- Francesco Valcanover, L'opera completa di Tiziano, Rizzoli, Milano 1969.
