= Paula Heron =

Canadian-American physics educator

- Known for: Development of conceptual understanding in topics in physics; development of formal reasoning skills

Academic background
- Education: University of Ottawa (BSc, MSc); University of Western Ontario (PhD)

Academic work
- Discipline: Physics Education Research
- Institutions: University of Washington

Paula R. L. Heron is a Canadian-American physics educator who works as a professor of physics at the University of Washington.

== Education ==
Heron has bachelor's and master's degrees in physics from the University of Ottawa in 1990 and 1991. She completed her Ph.D. at the University of Western Ontario in 1995.

== Service ==
Heron is one of the founders and leaders of "Foundations and Frontiers in Physics Education Research", a biennial conference in physics education. In 2014 she became co-chair of the Joint Task Force on Undergraduate Physics Programs of the American Association of Physics Teachers and American Physical Society (APS). She was chair for the 2020 term of the APS Topical Group on Physics Education Research.

== Recognition ==
In 2007, Heron was named a Fellow of the American Physical Society, after a nomination from the APS Forum on Education, "for her leadership in the physics education research community and development and active dissemination of research-based curricula that significantly impact physics instruction throughout the world". She was part of the University of Washington Physics Education Group that was honored in 2008 with the APS Excellence in Physics Education Award, "for leadership in advancing research methods in physics education, promoting the importance of physics education research as a subdiscipline of physics, and developing research-based curricula that have improved students' learning of physics from kindergarten to graduate school".
