= Keith Heron =

Australian rules footballer

Personal information
- Full name: Keith Edward Garnet Heron
- Born: 24 May 1890; Malmsbury, Victoria
- Died: 3 March 1975 (aged 84); Castlemaine, Victoria
- Original team: Permanent Artillery

Playing career^{1}
Years	Club	Games (Goals)
1909	St Kilda	1 (0)
- ^{1} Playing statistics correct to the end of 1909.

Keith Edward Garnet Heron (24 May 1890 – 3 March 1975) was an Australian rules footballer who played with St Kilda in the Victorian Football League (VFL).
