= Joseph Heron =

British lawyer, politician and administrator

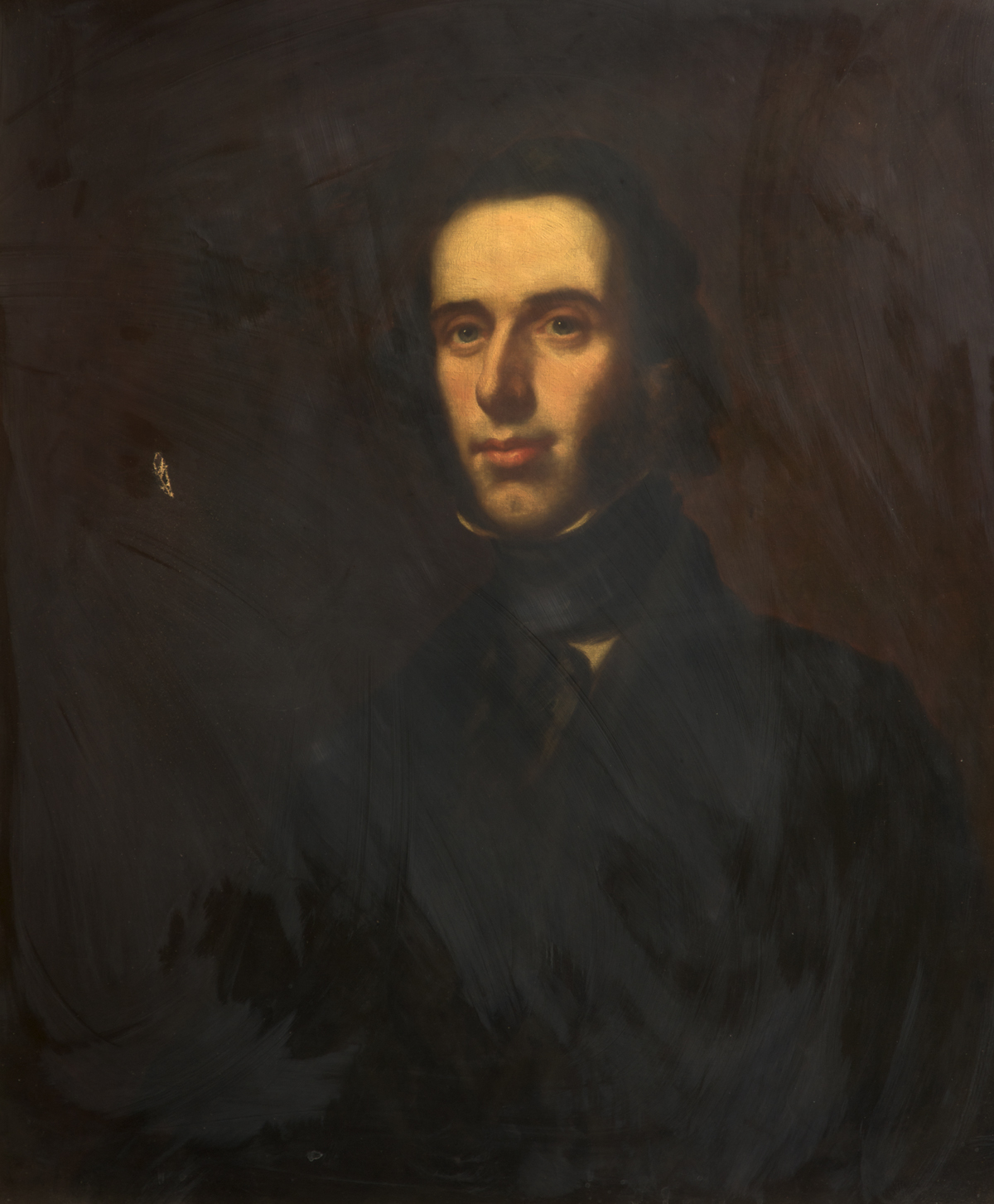
- Sir Joseph Heron by Edward Benson
- Born: 3 January 1809; Deansgate House, Manchester
- Died: 23 December 1889 (aged 80)
- Citizenship: British
- Occupations: lawyer, politician and administrator

Sir Joseph Heron (3 January 1809 - 23 December 1889) was a British lawyer, politician and administrator. He was town clerk of Manchester for over forty years, playing a dominant role in the city's growth throughout the 19th century.

== Biography ==
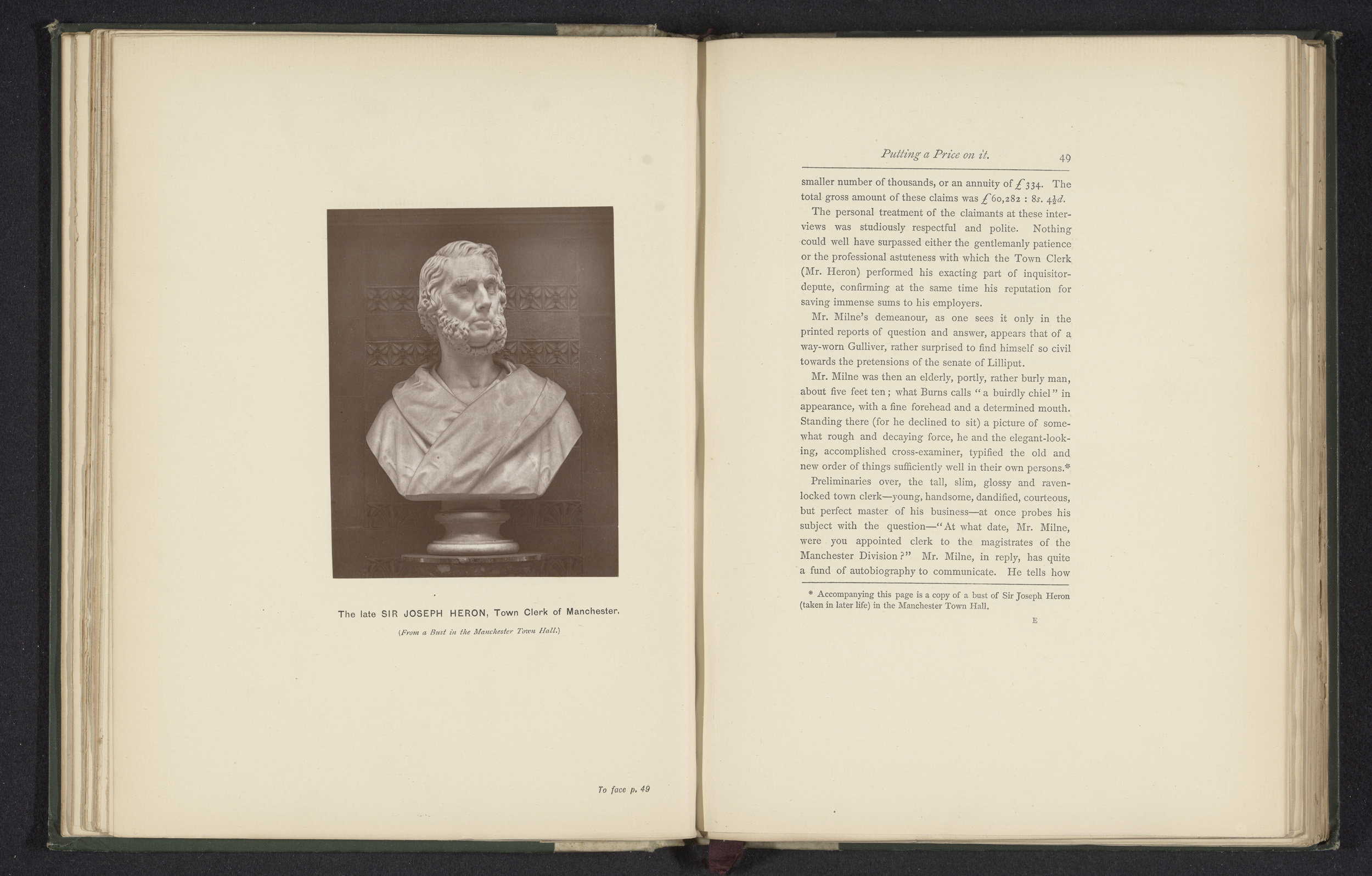
The bust of Sir Joseph Heron, in Manchester Town Hall; by Warrington Wood

Heron was born in Deansgate House, Manchester, the fourth of ten children of James Holt Heron, a cotton merchant. He came from a non-conformist family trained in Moravian schools. In 1838, he was handpicked by Thomas Potter to become the first town clerk of Manchester. Heron was unique amongst British municipal administrators due to his longevity and influence. He remained as town clerk from the inception of the role until his death in 1889. Amongst his contemporaries he was described as a consummate ruler of men, where his will was considered law in all civic matters and common public perception was that he was not only the town clerk but mayor and corporation all in one. He was instrumental in bringing clean water to Manchester by constructing the Longdendale chain of reservoirs – then the largest such project in the world.

He was knighted by Queen Victoria in 1869 and, in 1879, Alderman John King gifted the Manchester Corporation a bust of Heron sculpted by Warrington Wood. From 1879, he was consultant town clerk, and spent his later years in Bournemouth. He died in Cannes, France, on 23 December 1889.

== See also ==
- Heron House, Manchester
