= Haly Heron =

English writer and soldier

Captain Haly Heron (c. 1550–1591), was an English writer and soldier during the Elizabethan era.

== Biography ==
Haly matriculated as a sizar at Queens' College, Cambridge in November 1565 and completed his Bachelor of Arts in 1570. For the benefit of a pupil, John Kaye the younger, he wrote ‘A new Discourse of Morall Philosophie entituled the Kayes of Counsaile, not so pleasant as profitable for younge Courtiours,’ London, 1579. Shortly after the publication of the book, Haly entered the service of Sir Nicholas Malby in Connaught, Ireland. In December 1585 Thomas Randolph, at the instigation of his wife, who was related to Heron, gave him very unwillingly a note of introduction to Sir Francis Walsingham. In 1586, he served in the Low Countries during the Anglo-Spanish War and he was made a Captain in 1590. He was killed in May 1591, when leading an assault on a town in Brittany.
