= Gilbert Miller =

American theatrical producer (1884–1969)

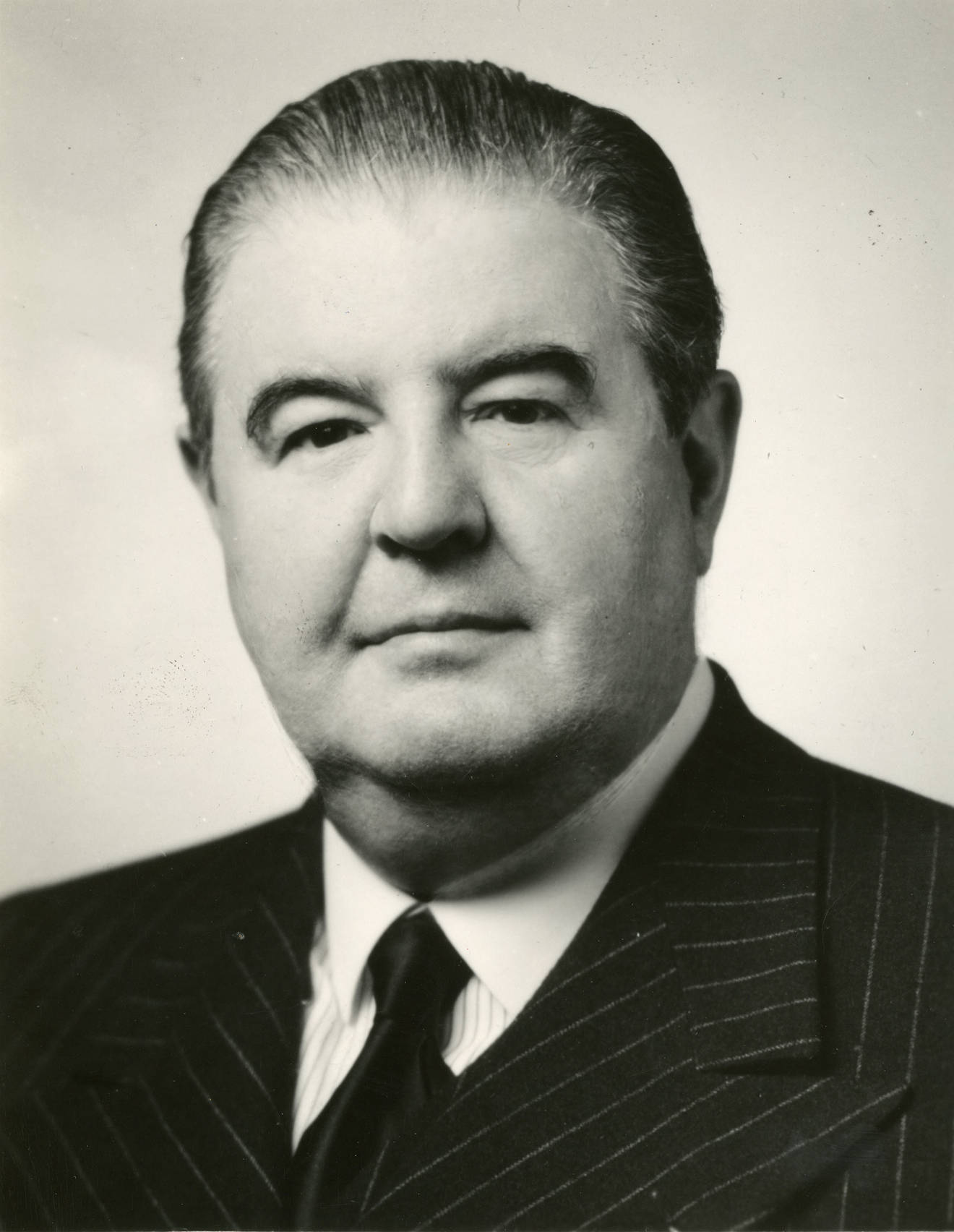
- Born: Gilbert Heron Miller; July 3, 1884; New York City, United States
- Died: January 3, 1969 (aged 84); New York City, United States
- Resting place: Woodlawn Cemetery, Bronx
- Occupation: theatrical producer
- Notable work: The Cocktail Party
- Spouses: Jessie F. Glendinning (divorced) Mary Margaret Allen (divorced) Kathryn (Kitty) Bache (m. 1927)
- Children: 1 daughter
- Awards: Tony Award for Best Play (1950}, Special Tony Award (1965)

Gilbert Heron Miller (July 3, 1884 – January 3, 1969) was an American theatrical producer.

Born in New York City, he was the son of English-born theatrical producer Henry Miller and Bijou Heron, a former child actress. Raised and educated in Europe, he returned home to follow in his father's footsteps and became a highly successful Broadway producer. Miller served as director of the League of New York Theatres as well as an officer of the Actors Fund. He brought the successful German-language play By Candlelight to New York in 1929 with a translation by P. G. Wodehouse. He also managed the St James's Theatre in London.

Nominated three times, Gilbert Miller won the Tony Award for Best Play in 1950 for his production of The Cocktail Party. In 1965, he was given a Special Tony Award "for having produced 88 plays and musicals and for his perseverance which has helped to keep New York and theatre alive."

Gilbert Miller died in 1969 and was interred in the Woodlawn Cemetery in The Bronx, New York.

== Private life ==
Miller's first wife was Jessie F. Glendinning, whom he divorced. She was an actress and the daughter of the actor John Glendinning, and the sister of Ernest Glendinning. They had one daughter, Dorothy.

His second wife was Mary Margaret Allen; they divorced.

His third wife was Kathryn (Kitty) Bache (1896–1979), a daughter of the Wall Street financier Jules Bache, a supporter of American theatre who in 1941 helped found the New York branch of the Escholier Club. They married in 1927 in Paris, France. Columbia University's Kathryn Bache Miller Theatre was named in her honor.
