= Alexander Heron Jr. =

American businessman

Alexander Heron Jr. (c. 1818 - April 8, 1865) was a businessman involved in shipping in Philadelphia, Pennsylvania, during the mid-19th century.

== Formative years ==
Heron was born in Gosten, County Londonderry, Ireland around 1818. Sometime during his late teens or early 20s, he emigrated from Ireland, and arrived in Philadelphia, Pennsylvania around 1835.

In 1851, he entered into a partnership with William J. Martin, forming Heron & Martin. Their ran a line of vessels between Philadelphia and Mobile, Alabama, Charleston, South Carolina, and Savannah, Georgia, establishing the first line of steamships to the latter two cities. After his company failed, he later became agent of the Ocean Steam Navigation Company, owning several company ships. During the American Civil War (1861-1865), Heron sold three of his ships to the United States Navy, the most prominent of which was the Keystone State.

== Death and interment ==
Heron died on April 8, 1865, at the Continental Hotel in Philadelphia. He was buried in Old Cathedral cemetery in Philadelphia.

== Family ==
Heron's sister, Matilda, became a noted actress.
