= Henry Miller (actor) =

American actor

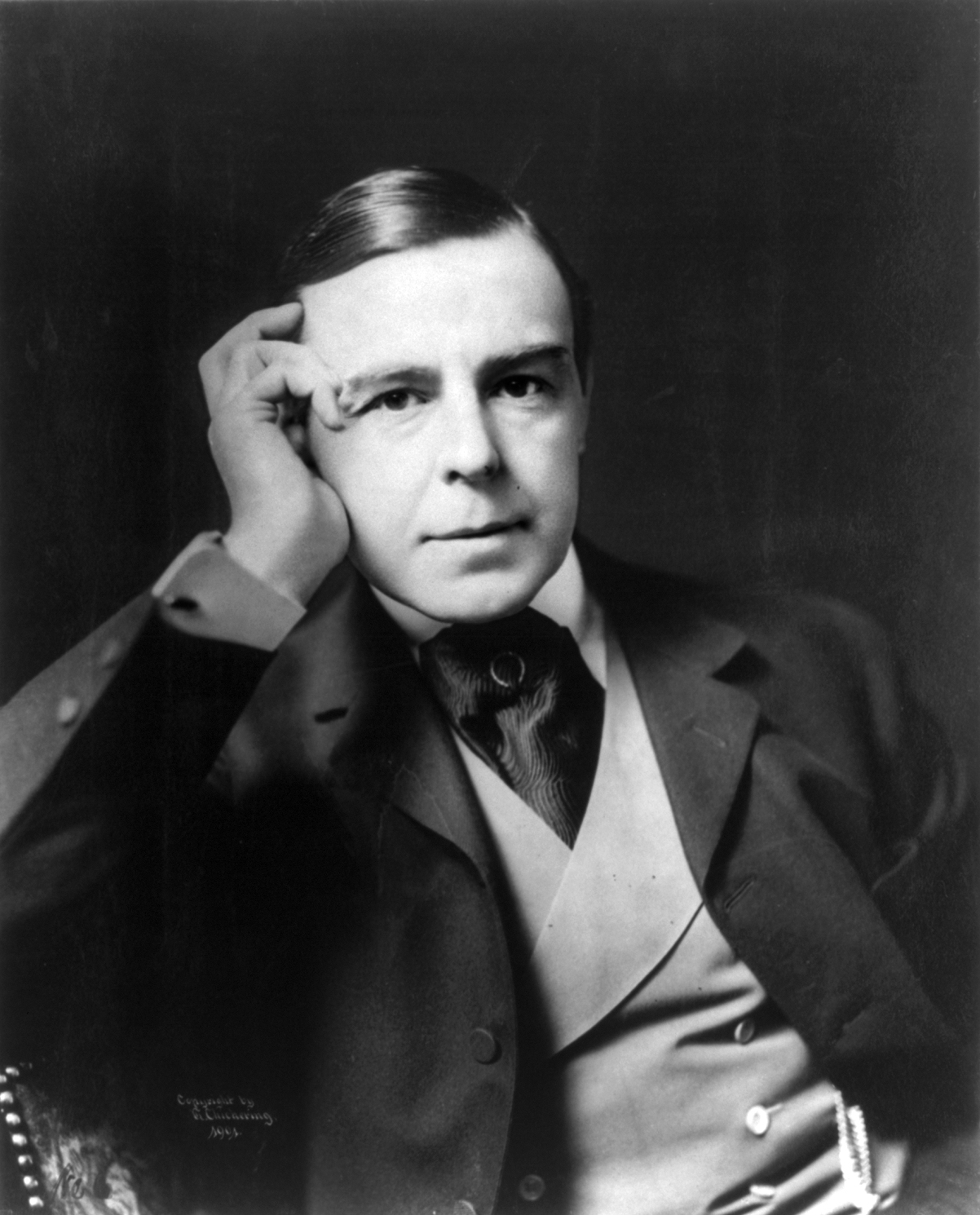
- Born: John Pegge; February 1, 1859; London, England, United Kingdom
- Died: April 9, 1926 (aged 67); New York City, New York, United States
- Occupations: Actor and theater manager
- Spouse: Bijou Heron
- Children: Gilbert Miller, Henry Miller, Jr., Agnes Miller

Henry Miller (February 1, 1859– April 9, 1926) was an English-born American actor, director, theatrical producer and manager.

Born as John Pegge in London, Miller's parents immigrated to Canada where he started acting as a juvenile. He first performed at the Grand Opera House in Toronto in 1878. He played juvenile roles in the Helena Modjeska company and performed with Ada Cavendish in the Adelaide Neilson company. He joined the Augustin Daly company to play in Odette opposite Bijou Heron. They were married February 1, 1883 in New York.

The following season, joined the Madison Square Theatre Company (Broadway theatre in New York City) where he starred with Minnie Maddern Fiske, Agnes Booth and Dion Boucicault. He was one of the original members of the Lyceum Theatre company. He became the leading man in Charles Frohman's stock company in New York City's Empire Theatre in 1893. He performed the starring role in Heartsease with the A. M. Palmer company in Chicago. He made a name for himself touring with Margaret Anglin in William Vaughn Moody's play, The Great Divide.

After 1908, Miller began working as a manager and was responsible for launching the acting careers of Alla Nazimova, Walter Hampden, Laura Hope Crews and Ruth Chatterton. With the backing of Elizabeth Milbank Anderson, who owned the lot at 124 West 43rd Street, he also built and operated Henry Miller's Theatre in New York.

The Millers had three children: Gilbert Miller, who would become a major producer on Broadway and in the West End, actor Henry Jr., and actress Agnes Miller, wo married actor Tim McCoy.
