= The Big Blow (Pratt novel) =

The Big Blow is a novel by Theodore Pratt published by Little, Brown and Company in 1936.

== Plot ==
The novel tells the story of Wade Barnett a Nebraska farmer who relocates to Florida with his invalid mother and imposing aunt. There he gets into conflict with the local Florida crackers led by Carney Jelks, and befriends an orphan girl, Celie, and her black caretaker, Clay.

His efforts at farming are defeated in his first year due to a frost, and his building of a nicer cabin than what the locals are accustomed to draws jealousy from his neighbors. His farming is later thwarted by drought and a tropical storm. A cock fight, a holy roller revival meeting, and an attempted lynching of Clay interrupted by the arrival of a hurricane are central events in the novel.

== Critical assessment ==
A critic for The Buffalo Newsstated, "If Mr. Pratt has exaggerated the people he paints, that will be forgiven him, for he knows how to tell a tale to make the reader see and feel this destitute borderland." The Philadelphia Inquirer review stated, "While enterprises of this sort are familiar in fiction, pungent characterization makes Big Blow decidedly worth while." The Baltimore Sun critic wrote, "What makes Mr. Pratt's book worth reading is the successful effort he has made to note down the folk ways, the prejudices, and the practices of his backwoods people. And, except that somebody has been kidding Mr. Pratt about the deadliness of the Florida scorpion, his observations have been extremely accurate". The Mount Vernon Argus noted that much of the novel, including Pratt's description of a Florida hurricane, was based on Pratt's own experiences living in Florida.

== Adaptation ==
Pratt adapted the novel into the play, The Big Blow. It was mounted on Broadway in the 1938-1939 season at Maxine Elliott's Theatre with Kendall Clark as Wade Barnett and Doe Doe Green as Clay.
