= Edwin Cooper (actor) =

Edwin Allvin Cooper (September 15, 1894 – February 2, 1984) was an American actor.

== Early life ==
The son of Clinton and Jesse Pierce Cooper, Edwin Allvin Cooper was born on September 15, 1894 in Genoa, Illinois. His father was a farmer who was also a contributing editor to the Prairie Farmer and a promoter of the interests of the Milk Producers Association. He became interested in becoming an actor while in high school, and had his first experience acting when he performed in a play written by his teacher about the English colonist Myles Standish.

== Stage career ==
Cooper began his career as an actor prior to World War I; going on the stage against the wishes of his parents and to the shock of his conservative Illinois hometown. By 1916 he was residing in Chicago. He was an actor in New York City when he was drafted during the war. He married Olga G. Westley in Brooklyn on 27 March 1920. At the urging of his wife he gave up his acting career, and worked several years as an interior decorator before returning to work in the theatre.

In the 1926-1927 season Cooper was a member of Eva Le Gallienne's theatre troupe with whom he performed in plays at Broadway's Civic Repertory Theatre; appearing as Pietro in Jacinto Benavente's Saturday Night (an English language translation of La noche del sábado by John Garrett Underhill) Curio in William Shakespeare's Twelfth Night, and Medvedev in Maxim Gorky's The Lower Depths. He continued to work as an interior decorator until business took a turn for the worse during the Great Depression. He got work as an actor in projects supported by the Federal Theatre Project (FTP), and around this time his first marriage ended in divorce.

In 1934 Cooper returned to Broadway as Mr. Jenkins in Joseph Anthony's A Ship Comes In at the Morosco Theatre. A string of Broadway roles followed with performances in Albert Bein's Let Freedom Ring (1935, as Paul Randolph; Broadhurst Theatre), Irwin Shaw's Bury the Dead (1936, as Priest; Ethel Barrymore Theatre) John C. Moffitt and Sinclair Lewis's It Can't Happen Here (1936-1937, as Shad Ledue; Adelphi Theatre), Ward Morehouse's Miss Quis (1937, Henry Miller's Theatre; as Amos Yadkin), and John Boruff and Walter Hart's Washington Jitters (1938, Guild Theatre; as 1st Senator and a Sign-Painter).

Cooper played the main villain, Carney Jelks, in the FTP production of Theodore Pratt The Big Blow at Maxine Elliott's Theatre during the 1938-1939 Broadway season. This followed by performances in the musical revue Sing for Your Supper at the Adelphi Theatre in 1939. He remained active on Broadway in the 1940s; performing as Dr. Hollister in Charlotte Armstrong's Ring Around Elizabeth (1941, Playhouse Theatre), Ralph West in Maxwell Anderson's The Eve of St. Mark (1942-1943, Cort Theatre), and as the 1st Legionnaire in Louis Solomon and Harold Buchman's Snafu (1944, Hudson Theatre).

In 1963 Cooper portrayed Doctor Reeber in Hugh Martin, Ralph Blane, and John Cecil Holm's Off-Broadway musical Best Foot Forward at Stage 73. Of In 1971 he portrayed Andrew McNair in the musical 1776 at the Shubert Theatre in New Haven. In 1976 he toured the Pacific Northwest with the Seattle Repertory Theatre.

== Film and television ==
On film, Cooper portrayed David Armstrong in Blondie Knows Best (1946), Davidson in the musical comedy film Sing While You Dance (1946), the surgeon in The Guilt of Janet Ames (1947), Harry Spooner in The Hucksters (1947), Maj. Gen. Waldron in B.F.'s Daughter (1948), Bradbury in State of the Union (1948), Head Surgeon in Homecoming (1948), and the Baggage Man in Lost Boundaries (1949). His final film role was as the grandfather in Ragtime (1981).

On television he made appearances Lux Video Theatre, Kraft Television Theatre, and Studio One among other programs.

== Personal life and death ==
Cooper had one daughter, Laura Cooper, with his first wife. His second wife was Anastazia Perun Cooper. He lived the last 35 years of his life in Newtown, Connecticut. He died in Danbury, Connecticut on February 2, 1984.
