= Doe Doe Green =

American actor

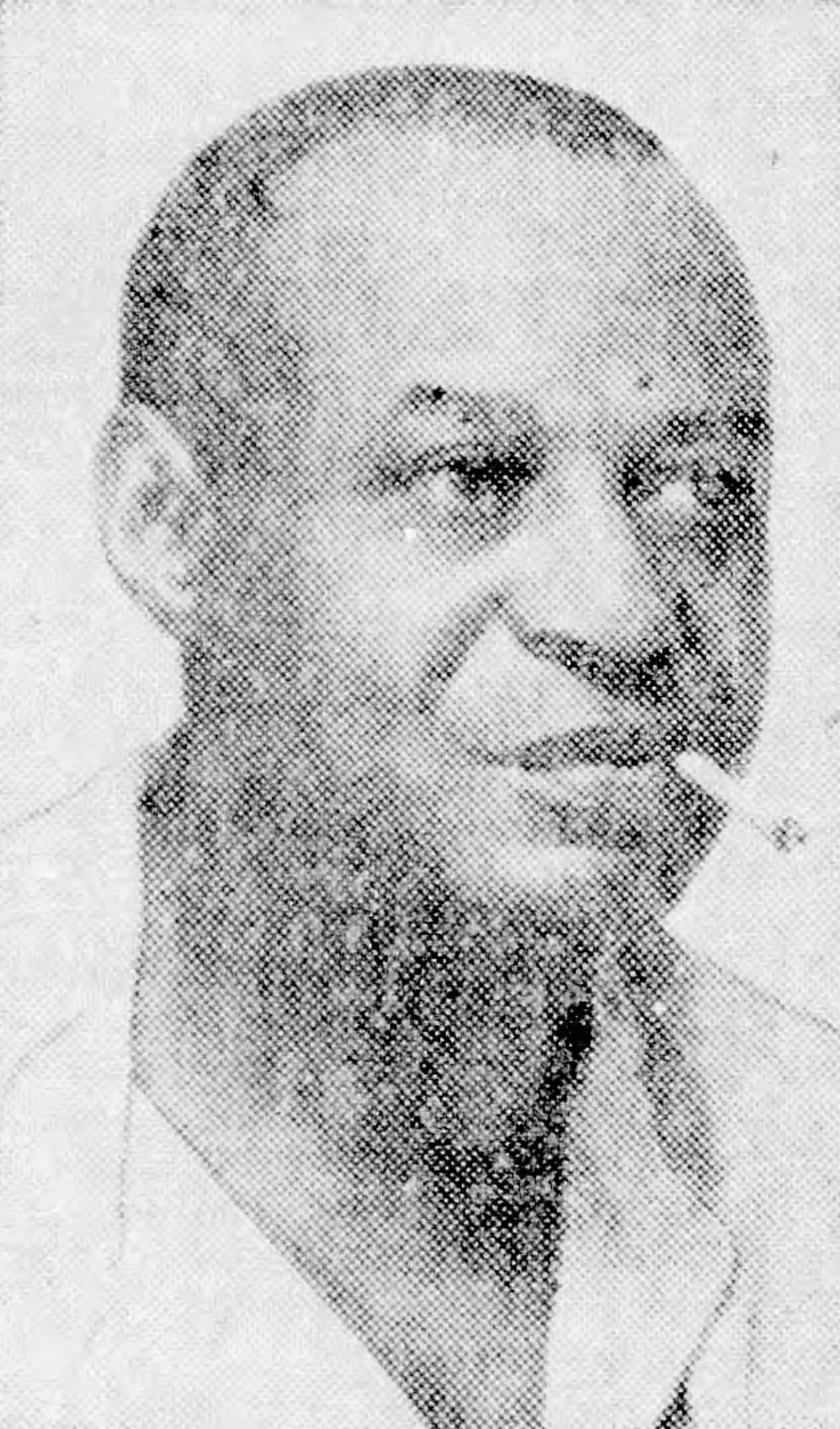
Green c. 1939

Doe Doe Green (born Tom Overton, September 22, 1889 – March 12, 1944) was an American actor and playwright.

== Biography ==
=== Early life and career ===
Tom Overton was born in Clinton, Oklahoma on September 22, 1889. He was mixed-race with his father of Muscogee heritage and his mother of African-American heritage.

In 1909 he joined a minstrel show organized by Percy Williams in Boley, Oklahoma in which he was billed as "Tom Overton, eccentric comedian". He joined the 101 Ranch Circus where he performed as an expert marksman shooting clay pigeons. It was with this organization that he adopted the stage name Doe Doe Green.

As Doe Doe Green he starred in a vaudeville sketch he authored titled The Ranchman's Daughter in 1913. In 1914 he was engaged at the Standard Theatre, Philadelphia in performances with the Blank Sisters, and performed in vaudeville in Chicago. That same year appeared with comedy duo Goodbar & Lewis at the Lincoln Theatre in Cincinnati, Ohio. In 1915 he performed in the play What a Woman Will Do at Church's Park Theater in Memphis, and starred in a touring production of Mr. Ragtime in the theatre company of Irvin C. Miller. He co-wrote the latter play with Miller. He also starred in the title role of Miller's play Jake's Family in 1915.

Green's play Reed Bird was staged at the Grand Theatre in Chicago in 1916. In 1917 he had his own theatre troupe which was engaged at the Bijou Theatre in Nashville. In 1918 he once again performed with Irvin Miller's stock theatre company. In 1919 he joined with Will Brown to form the vaudeville comedy act Green & Brown.

=== 1920s performances ===
In 1920 Green starred in Quintard Miller's Broadway Gossips at the Howard Theatre in Washington D.C. and the Lafayette Theatre in Harlem. In 1921 he was a member of a stock theatre company in residence at the Lincoln Theatre in Kansas City, Missouri, and also led his own theatre troupe for performances at theaters in Chicago and St. Louis. A 1922 review of his performance with the Jack "Ginger" Wiggins company described him as a "popular neat dancing comedian".

In December 1922 Green made his Broadway debut as Sam Sykes in Miller and Maceo Pinkard's musical Liza at Daly's 63rd Street Theatre. He subsequently toured in this show in 1923. That same year his 2-act play Back to Africa was copyrighted. In December 1923 he reprised the character of Sam Sykes in the premiere of musical Dinah in Chicago; a sequel to Liza with much of the same cast. He toured in both Dinah and Liza in 1924. In November 1924 he performed in The Hidden Treasures at the Lafayette Theatre, Harlem.

In 1925 Green starred in the musical Aces and Queens (later retitled Oil Scandals)at the Academy of Music, Baltimore and the Howard Theatre in Washington D.C. This was followed by performances that same year in the musical How Come. In October 1925 he returned to Broadway as Rufus Jones in Garland Anderson's play Appearances at the Frolic Theatre. He achieved acclaim for his portrayal of Gabriel in the original production of the Pulitzer Prize winning drama The Green Pastures which ran in the early 1930s. He was the understudy for the original actor Wesley Hill and Hill's successor Sam Davis before becoming the third actor in the show's long run to play Gabriel; taking on the role when Davis died in February 1932 when the production was on tour.

=== Later career ===
Green portrayed Booker T in the 1931 film Enemies of the Law. That same year he starred as Scipio Johnson in the Broadway production of Miss Gulliver Travels at the Hudson Theatre.

In the 1938 drama The Big Blow, staged at Maxine Elliott's Theatre, he was the only African American in the cast playing a role described as "a Negro lost in a white man's world" as he seeks to protect an orphaned white girl. His character is confronted by a racist white mob intent on lynching him when a sudden hurricane hits Florida and brings everyone's lives into peril.

In 1939 he returned to the Hudson Theatre to perform the part of Thurston in Justin Sturm's I Know What I Like. His final Broadway performance was as Jupiter in Sidney Kingsley's The Patriots at the National Theatre in 1943.

=== Death ===
Green died at New York Cancer Hospital in Manhattan in March 1944.

== Partial list of theatrical roles ==
- Jake's Family (1915, as Jake)
- Bon Bon Buddy, Jr. (1922, Sam Johnson)
- Liza (1922, as Sam Sykes)
- Dinah (1923, as Sam Sykes)
- Appearances (1925, as Rufus)
- The Green Pastures (1932, as Gabriel)
- The Big Blow (1937, as Clay)
- The Patriots (1943, as Jupiter)
