= USS Pierce =

US Navy Ormsby-class attack transport in service 1942-1946

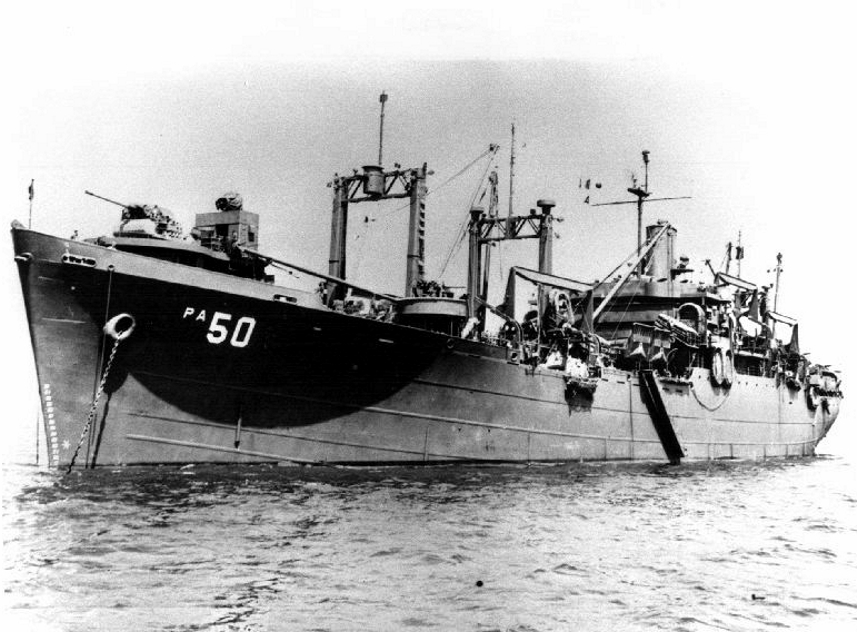
- USS Pierce (APA-50) at anchor, date and place unknown

History

United States
- Name: USS Pierce (APA-50)
- Namesake: Pierce County, Georgia; Pierce County, Nebraska; Pierce County, North Dakota; Pierce County, Washington; Pierce County, Wisconsin
- Builder: Moore Dry Dock
- Laid down: 22 July 1942
- Launched: 10 October 1942
- Christened: Northern Light
- Commissioned: 30 June 1943
- Decommissioned: 11 March 1946
- Renamed: USS Pierce (APA-50), American Planter
- Reclassified: AP-95 to APA-50, 1 February 1943
- Stricken: 17 April 1946
- Identification: MCV Hull Type C2-S-B1, MCV Hull No. 289
- Honors and awards: Six battle stars for World War II service
- Fate: Scrapped May 1969

General characteristics
- Class & type: Ormsby-class attack transport
- Tonnage: 8,250 GRT
- Displacement: 7,300 tons (lt), 13,910 t. (fl)
- Length: 459 ft 3 in (139.98 m)
- Beam: 63 ft 1 in (19.23 m)
- Draft: 27 ft (8.22960000 m)
- Propulsion: 1 x General Electric geared drive turbine, 2 x Foster-Wheeler D-type boilers, 1 x propeller, designed shaft horsepower 6,000
- Speed: 16 knots
- Capacity: Troops: 91 Officers, 1,475 Enlisted; Cargo: 150,000 cu ft, 2,700 tons
- Complement: Officers 43, Enlisted 478
- Armament: 2 x 5"/38 caliber dual-purpose gun mounts, 2 x Bofors 40mm gun mounts, 4 x twin 20mm gun, 14 x 20mm single gun mounts.

USS Pierce (APA-50) was an Ormsby-class attack transport that served with the US Navy during World War II.

Pierce (APA-50) was laid down as Northern Light (MC hull 289) by Moore Dry Dock of Oakland, California 22 July 1942; launched 10 October 1942; and commissioned 30 June 1943.

== World War II ==
After a brief shakedown period Pierce sailed for Hawaii to join the Fifth Amphibious Force, Pacific Fleet. Immediately upon arrival at Pearl Harbor the ship was assigned to a transport division and was given an intensive two weeks of training in amphibious warfare and gunnery.

=== Invasion of Makin ===
Following a dress rehearsal, Pierce sailed as a unit of the task force assigned to capture, occupy and defend the Japanese held island of Makin, Gilbert Islands.

Off the western end of Makin 20 November 1943, Pierce made her first assault landing. During the night of the 23rd the Japanese made their final banzai charge. In the early pre-dawn hours of the next morning there was a terrific explosion and huge pillars of flame shot skyward as the escort carrier Liscome Bay was torpedoed.

With Makin secured, Pierce's boats and LSTs brought back to the ship the ragged, weary assault troops of the 27th Infantry Division.

=== Invasion of Kwajalein ===
Arriving in Pearl Harbor 2 December the transport discharged her troops and spent the next week overhauling equipment and boats. Pierce was occupied for the ensuing five weeks off Maui, T.H., training some 200 officers and 4000 enlisted men of the Army and Marine Corps in the art of amphibious warfare.

Carrying men of the 7th Infantry Division, Pierce got underway for Kwajalein Atoll in the Marshall Islands 22 January 1944. Kwajalein's capture, following the same pattern as that of Makin only on a much larger scale, was achieved within a week. During the night of 3 February Pierce sent five boats to one of the smaller islands to evacuate approximately 150 Army troops trapped by the enemy. Under enemy fire the boats were loaded with troops and returned through the reef to the lagoon.

Upon departure from Kwajalein 8 February, Pierce went to the Naval Repair Base, San Diego, California for overhaul.

=== Invasion of Saipan ===
On 14 March she commenced the training of three landing teams of the 81st Infantry Division, totaling some 200 officers and 4,000 enlisted men. This training took place at Coronado Strand, San Clemente Island and Aliso Canyon, California, and consumed the next six weeks.

Once again, 1 May, she sailed for Pearl Harbor, this time to exercise a battalion landing team of the 4th Marines in preparation for the pending operation. All preparations being completed, the ship stood out of Pearl Harbor 29 May and joined other units of a task force en route to Saipan, Marianas Islands. Pierce, as a combat loaded assault transport, was a unit of the Northern Attack Group and was assigned the mission of landing assault troops and equipment in the vicinity of Charan-Kanoa, Saipan. Pierce completed the unloading of all assault troops and their equipment 15 June. Enemy activity lessened after two hours and Pierce was ordered to close the reef to receive casualties and discharge cargo.

==== Engagement with enemy ground forces ====
After retiring for the night the ship returned to Saipan and stood in to the line of departure south of Charan-Kanoa to receive casualties, which were taken on board until the sick bay facilities were taxed to the utmost. Two hundred forty-nine casualties were received aboard in less than three hours. That afternoon Pierce fired forty-eight rounds of 5-inch projectiles, silencing two mortar positions in the hills.

==== Air attacks and transfer of casualties ====
On the next day, 17 June, Army artillery aboard was dispatched ashore. At sunset Pierce underwent the usual two-hour air attack. Due to the proximity of the Japanese fleet she retired to the northeast of Saipan leaving an imposing force of U.S. heavy ships between herself and the enemy fleet. She returned to Saipan on Friday of that week and by Saturday had completed unloading and transferring casualties to two hospital ships. That evening she departed for Eniwetok amidst an air attack. After standing by on call for a week she reached Pearl Harbor 20 July.

=== Invasion of Palaus ===
For the next three weeks Pierce made repairs, trained troops of the 81st Infantry Division, and enjoyed a brief breather from forward area activities. On 12 August Pierce sailed with a task force to Guadalcanal, which was reached on the 24th. After two rehearsals at Guadalcanal she departed for the assault on Angaur in the Palau Islands.

In the Palau Islands on the morning of 15 September, while the 1st Marine Division landed on the island of Peleliu, Pierce in company with the Angaur Attack Force made a diversionary feint along the east coast of Babelthuap Island, keeping out of range of shore batteries. The invasion of Angaur commenced two days later. Upon completion of the unloading Pierce went to Manus, Admiralty Islands, which was reached on 28 September.

=== Invasion of Leyte ===
By 8 October personnel of the 1st Cavalry Division were embarked and all equipment loaded. After staging a rehearsal landing the task force of which Pierce was a unit sailed 12 October for the initial assault on Leyte in the Philippines. She reached Leyte Island on the morning of 20 October after passing through enemy mine fields in Surigao Straits. Movement to the objective was uneventful. Evening found the ship underway standing out through mine fields to the open sea. On 23 October she was anchored in Kossol Passage, Palau Islands with several hundred miles separating her from the Japanese fleets converging on Leyte Gulf.

On 28 October the ship began a long tour of Pacific outposts, stopping first at Guam, Marianas to load personnel and equipment of the 77th Infantry Division and sailing from there to Nouméa, New Caledonia. Orders were changed en route on 11 November and she headed west to Manus.

==== Enemy aircraft kills ====
Two days later Pierce set sail for Leyte. She was quietly unloading the ship on 24 November off Taraguna, Leyte when three enemy planes attacked and were shot down. The emptied Pierce sailed that day to Hollandia, New Guinea, and arrived 29 November.

There followed two weeks of repairs and rest in Hollandia, after which Pierce departed for Sansapor, New Guinea. At that base she loaded personnel and equipment of the 6th Infantry Division, practiced landing operations and spent Christmas. Early on 30 December Pierce shot down one enemy plane.

=== Invasion of Luzon ===
That afternoon she sailed from Sansapor with a task group bound for the initial assault on Luzon, Philippine Islands, at Lingayen Gulf. The trip was not without excitement as each dawn and dusk brought enemy planes over the disposition, but no hits were scored on Pierce.

==== Pierce suffers casualties ====
With the exception of one group of enemy planes the approach into Lingayen Gulf on the morning of 9 January 1945 went off without interference. Unloading was progressing nicely when an enemy plane came out of the sun unobserved and attempted to glide bomb Pierce, but he let loose his bomb too soon and it fell abreast the port side of No. 5 hatch, demolishing one of the ship's boats lying nearby and killing two men.

==== Uneventful landing ====
Next the ship loaded personnel and equipment of the 38th Army Division, conducted a rehearsal landing and sailed again for Luzon, this time to take part in the initial assault on beaches near the town of LaPaz, north of Subic Bay. The whole operation was pleasantly uneventful, and instead of enemy opposition at the beachhead only friendly natives were present. She returned to Leyte for repairs and spent most of February unloading merchant ships.

=== Invasion of Okinawa ===
Personnel and equipment of the 7th Infantry Division were loaded by 10 March. After the usual rehearsal Pierce departed Leyte with a task group amidst high seas and headed for Okinawa Jima, Nansei Shoto. Except for aircraft which appeared in the vicinity only to be promptly shot down, the trip was uneventful. Pierce stood into the transport area off Okinawa on the morning of 1 April. As the ship was retiring for the night Japanese planes got through the combat air patrol, one kamikaze crashing into a transport about 800 yards on Pierce's starboard beam.

On the following day the ship continued unloading, then retired for the night and completed unloading the next day. On 5 April Pierce was ordered to sail with other unloaded transports to Guam, whence she continued on to California.

=== After hostilities ===
During the next ten weeks the ship was overhauled in San Francisco. Pierce then went to San Diego for refresher training. While the ship was again en route to the war zone, with Eniwetok only a few hundred miles away, the electrifying "cease all offensive operations" message was received 15 August 1945. Pausing in the Philippines, Pierce continued on to the Japanese home islands and to Korea for occupation duty. She returned to San Francisco 13 November, only to put to sea again on the 30th bound for Manila.

At Manila 19–23 December the transport was loaded with home-bound veterans, then crossed the Pacific to make San Francisco 11 January 1946. Pierce departed 21 January, transited the Panama Canal and arrived at New Orleans 6 February.

=== Decommission ===
Pierce decommissioned at Mobile, Alabama, 11 March 1946. She was struck from the Navy List 17 April 1946 and delivered to the Maritime Commission for further disposal 2 May 1946. She was sold to her former owner 28 July 1947.

=== Awards ===
Pierce received six battle stars for World War II service.

== Legacy ==
One of the serving officers on the USS Pierce was Kenneth Dodson, a former civilian mariner. After the war he became an author and wrote the novel Away All Boats, published by Little Brown & Co. in 1954. The book was based on his experiences on the ship which he renamed the Belinda in the novel. In 1956 the book was made into a movie by Universal Pictures using the same title starring Jeff Chandler, George Nader and a young Richard Boone. Clint Eastwood has one speaking line playing an uncredited role as a Navy Corpsman.

== Commercial service ==
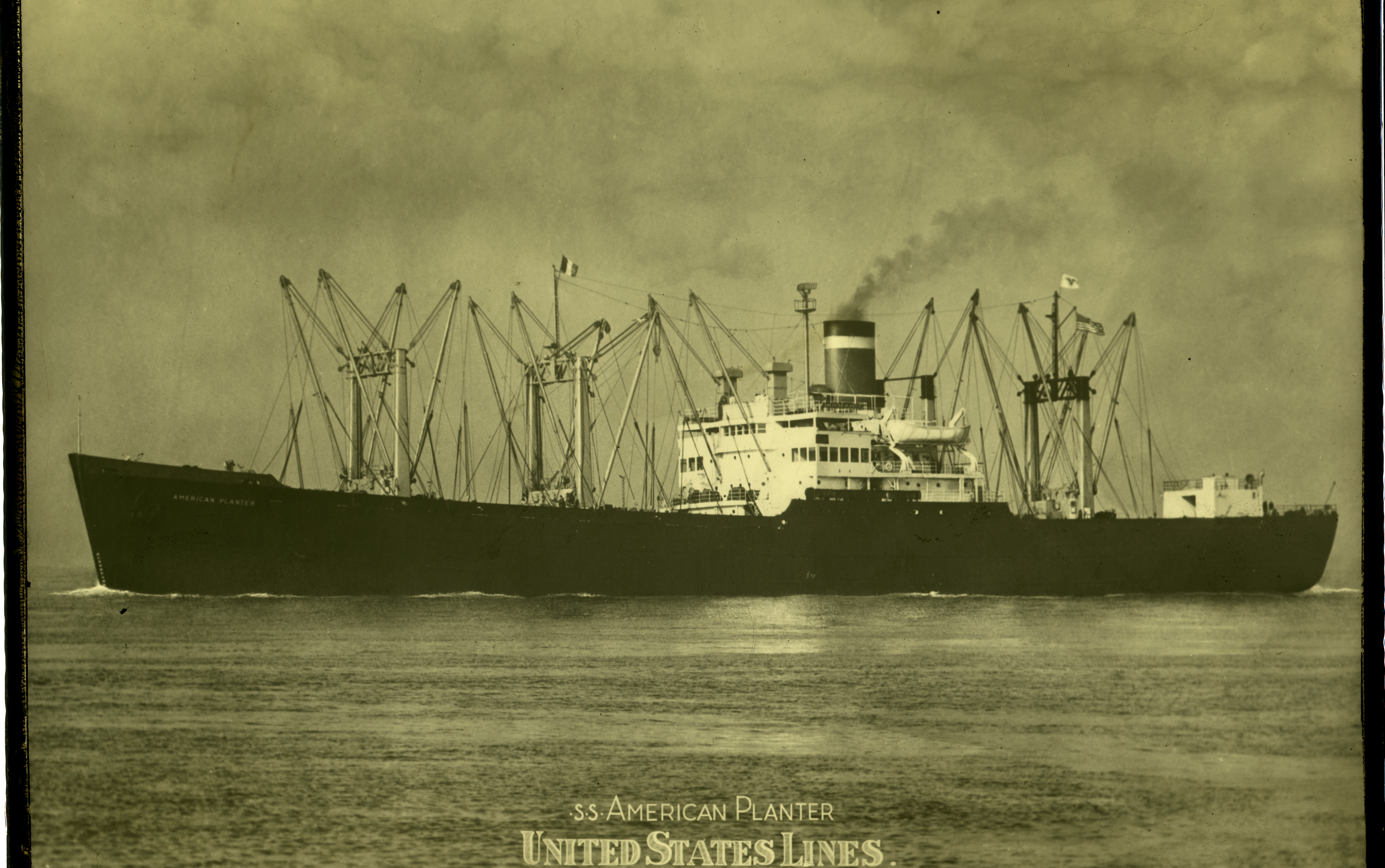
The ship as American Planter

Pierce was transferred for commercial service on 24 October 1947 to United States Lines, which renamed her American Planter. On 13 June 1965, American Planter was returned to the Maritime Administration and laid up in the National Defense Reserve Fleet, James River, Lee Hall, Virginia. On 26 August 1965, she was chartered to States Marine for MSTS service. She was returned to MARAD and the Reserve Fleet, this time at Suisun Bay, California, on 17 November 1967.

On 3 March 1969, American Planter was purchased for scrapping by National Metal and Steel Corporation of Terminal Island, California. She was transferred from the Reserve Fleet on 25 March and scrapped at Terminal Island in May.
