= Walter Baldwin =

American actor (1889–1977)

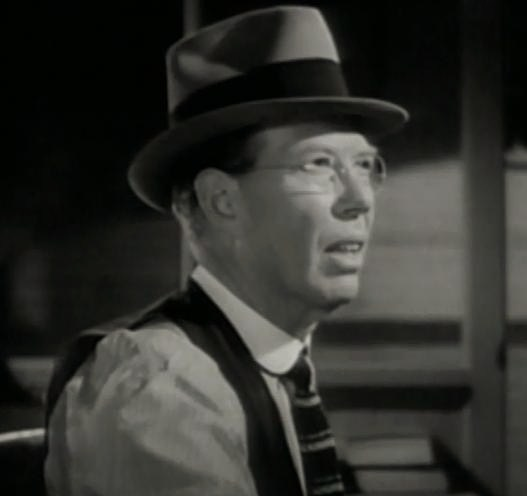
- Walter Baldwin in the film The Strange Love of Martha Ivers (1946)
- Born: Walter Smith Baldwin Jr. January 2, 1889; Lima, Ohio, US
- Died: January 27, 1977 (aged 88); Santa Monica, California, US
- Years active: 1936–1971

Walter Smith Baldwin Jr. (January 2, 1889 − January 27, 1977) was an American character actor whose career spanned five decades and 150 film and television roles, and numerous stage performances.

Baldwin was born January 2, 1889, in Lima, Ohio, into a theatrical family: his father Walter S. Baldwin Sr. and mother Pearl Melville (a sister of Rose Melville) were both actors. He joined his parents' stock theatre company, and in 1915 married fellow actress Geraldine Blair.

== Career ==
He was best known for playing the father of the disabled sailor in The Best Years of Our Lives (1946). He was the first actor to portray the town character "Floyd the Barber" on The Andy Griffith Show starring Andy Griffith and Don Knotts.on television, 1960 to 1968.

=== Theater career ===
Prior to his first film roles in 1939, Baldwin had appeared in more than a dozen Broadway plays in New York City. He played "Whit"/ in the first Broadway production in 1938 of Of Mice and Men, based on famous author John Steinbeck's best-selling novel published the previous year of 1937, ànd also appeared in the original Grand Hotel (1931) play in a small role, as well as serving as the production's stage manager. He originated the role of "Bensinger", the prissy 'Chicago Tribune' reporter, in the 1928 Broadway production in New York City of The Front Page (later subject of several other subsequent productions / media).

=== Television career ===
In the 1960s he had small acting roles in television comedy shows such as Petticoat Junction and Green Acres. In 1967 he portrayed a stable owner in the "Fandango" episode (Season 12, Episode 21) on the famous long-running (1955 to 1975) of TV Western series on Gunsmoke. He continued to act in motion pictures, and one of his last roles was in Rosemary's Baby. (1968).

Baldwin was known for playing solid middle class burghers, although sometimes he gave portrayals of eccentric characters. He played a customer seeking a prostitute in The Lost Weekend (1945), and the rebellious prison trusty "Orvy" in Cry of the City (1948).

=== John Deere company ===
Walter Baldwin was featured in a lot of "John Deere Day" movies during the 1950s, from 1949 to 1959 where he played the farmer "Tom Gordon". In this series of Deere Day advertising / marketing movies for over a decade shown as short subjects between usually two other major feature films along with cartoons, newsreels and previews of coming attractions (trailers) such as in a "double feature" program shown in local neighborhood movie theatres. This was in the early television broadcasting era (with commercials occupying usually 10 minutes out of every half-hour program). He helped to introduce to rural country movie theatre audiences about many new pieces of John Deere farming / agriculture machinery and equipment year-by-year. In each yearly movie along with an interesting short story line, he would be shown in a "Tom Gordon Family Film" where he would always be buying new John Deere farm equipment or a new green and yellow tractor in the traditional John Deere colors. A picture of Walter Baldwin playing "Tom Gordon" can be found on page 108 of Bob Pripp's farm equipment history book "John Deere: Yesterday & Today"

Hal Erickson writes in the AllMovie Internet website / database on films: "With a pinched Midwestern countenance that enabled him to portray taciturn farmers, obsequious grocery store clerks and the occasional sniveling coward, Baldwin was a familiar (if often unbilled) presence in Hollywood films for three decades."

== Selected filmography ==
- Frontier Marshal (1939) – (scenes deleted)
- Those High Grey Walls (1939) – Mr. Mason (uncredited)
- The Secret of Dr. Kildare (1939) – Finch (uncredited)
- Cafe Hostess (1940) – Jones (uncredited)
- Angels Over Broadway (1940) – Rennick (uncredited)
- I'm Nobody's Sweetheart Now (1940) – Elmer
- Arizona (1940) – Man Who Declares for the South (uncredited)
- The Devil Commands (1941) – Seth Marcy
- The Devil and Daniel Webster (1941) – Hank (uncredited)
- Miss Polly (1941) – Lem Wiggins
- They Died with Their Boots On (1941) – Settler (uncredited)
- Look Who's Laughing (1941) – Bill
- Harvard, Here I Come (1941) – Prof. MacSquigley
- Kings Row (1942) – Deputy Constable (uncredited)
- The Man Who Returned to Life (1942) – Homer, the Barber (uncredited)
- The Adventures of Martin Eden (1942) – Postman (uncredited)
- The Remarkable Andrew (1942) – Hugo French (uncredited)
- Scattergood Rides High (1942) – Martin Knox
- In This Our Life (1942) – Worker (uncredited)
- Syncopation (1942) – Tom Jones (uncredited)
- Powder Town (1942) – Jerry, Nitrate Technician (uncredited)
- For Me and My Gal (1942) – Bill (uncredited)
- Laugh Your Blues Away (1942) – Clerk (uncredited)
- Tennessee Johnson (1942) – Captain Reporting Shooting (uncredited)
- Let's Have Fun (1943) – Hotel Clerk (uncredited)
- After Midnight with Boston Blackie (1943) – Diamond Ed Barnaby (uncredited)
- Prairie Chickens (1943) – Gas Station Attendant (uncredited)
- A Stranger in Town (1943) – Tom Cooney
- The Kansan (1943) – Judge Lorrimer (uncredited)
- Always a Bridesmaid (1943) – Ephraim – County Clerk
- Sweet Rosie O'Grady (1943) – Mailman (uncredited)
- Happy Land (1943) – Jake Hibbs (uncredited)
- The Ghost That Walks Alone (1944) – Deputy (uncredited)
- You Can't Ration Love (1944) – Deli Manager in Paramount Newsreel (uncredited)
- Since You Went Away (1944) – Train Station Gateman (uncredited)
- Louisiana Hayride (1944) – Lem (uncredited)
- Mr. Winkle Goes to War (1944) – Mr. Plummer (mailman) (uncredited)
- Wilson (1944) – Wilson Campaign Orator (uncredited)
- Reckless Age (1944) – Conductor (uncredited)
- Tall in the Saddle (1944) – Stan – Depot Master (uncredited)
- Dark Mountain (1944) – Uncle Sam Bates
- The Mark of the Whistler (1944) – Fireman (uncredited)
- I'm from Arkansas (1944) – Packing Company Attorney
- The Missing Juror (1944) – Town Sheriff (uncredited)
- Faces in the Fog (1944) – Doan (jury foreman) (uncredited)
- Together Again (1944) – Witherspoon (uncredited)
- I'll Be Seeing You (1944) – Train Vendor (replaced by Olin Howland) (uncredited)
- Roughly Speaking (1945) – Jake – Wholesaler (uncredited)
- Bring On the Girls (1945) – Henry (uncredited)
- The Power of the Whistler (1945) – Western Union agent (uncredited)
- Blonde Ransom (1945) – Sheriff (uncredited)
- Trail to Vengeance (1945) – Bart Jackson
- Captain Eddie (1945) – Serious Man (uncredited)
- Scared Stiff (1945) – Deputy with Rifle (uncredited)
- Murder, He Says (1945) – Vic Hardy (uncredited)
- Christmas in Connecticut (1945) – Sheriff Potter (uncredited)
- State Fair (1945) – Farmer (uncredited)
- Rhythm Round-Up (1945) – Jed Morton
- The Lost Weekend (1945) – Man from Albany (uncredited)
- Why Girls Leave Home (1945) – Wilbur Harris
- Abilene Town (1946) – Train Conductor (uncredited)
- Claudia and David (1946) – Farmer (uncredited)
- Young Widow (1946) – Miller (uncredited)
- To Each His Own (1946) – Sam Foreman (uncredited)
- Talk About a Lady (1946) – Clem (uncredited)
- Johnny Comes Flying Home (1946) – Henry (uncredited)
- Dragonwyck (1946) – Tom Wilson – Farmer (uncredited)
- The Bride Wore Boots (1946) – Mr. Hodges – Postman (uncredited)
- The Strange Love of Martha Ivers (1946) – Dempsey (uncredited)
- Our Hearts Were Growing Up (1946) – Druggist (uncredited)
- Sing While You Dance (1946) – Handy
- Mr. Ace (1946) – Bookie – Party Guest (uncredited)
- Sister Kenny (1946) – Mr. Ferguson (uncredited)
- The Best Years of Our Lives (1946) – Mr. Parrish
- Cross My Heart (1946) – Coroner (uncredited)
- Ladies' Man (1947) – Clem (uncredited)
- The Perfect Marriage (1947) – Horse Ring Attendant (uncredited)
- The Beginning or the End (1947) – Workman (uncredited)
- Millie's Daughter (1947) – Pavilion Manager (uncredited)
- King of the Wild Horses (1947) – Stationmaster DevineDuveen (uncredited)
- Framed (1947) – Assistant Manager (uncredited)
- The Millerson Case (1947) – Link Hazen, Lawyer (uncredited)
- Unconquered (1947) – Villager (uncredited)
- The Unsuspected (1947) – Judge Maynard – Justice of the Peace
- Mourning Becomes Electra (1947) – Amos Ames
- Albuquerque (1948) – Judge Fred Martin
- Winter Meeting (1948) – Mr. Castle
- Hazard (1948) – Alfred Clumby, Bookie
- Return of the Bad Men (1948) – Muley Wilson
- The Man from Colorado (1948) – Tom Barton (uncredited)
- Rachel and the Stranger (1948) – Gallus
- Cry of the City (1948) – Orvy
- The Gay Amigo (1949) – Stoneham – Editor
- Calamity Jane and Sam Bass (1949) – Doc Purdy
- Special Agent (1949) – Pop Peters
- Come to the Stable (1949) – Claude Jarman – Realtor (uncredited)
- Thieves' Highway (1949) – Officer Riley – Market Patrolman (uncredited)
- Cheaper by the Dozen (1950) – Jim Bracken (uncredited)
- Stella (1950) – Farmer (uncredited)
- The Jackpot (1950) – Watch Buyer (uncredited)
- Storm Warning (1951) – Coroner Bledsoe
- Rough Riders of Durango (1951) – Cricket Adams
- A Millionaire for Christy (1951) – Mr. Sloane (scenes deleted)
- The Racket (1951) – Booking Sgt. Sullivan
- I Want You (1951) – George Kress Sr.
- Carrie (1952) – Mr. Meeber – Carrie's Father
- Something for the Birds (1952) – Bigelow (uncredited)
- Scandal at Scourie (1953) – Michael Hayward
- Ride, Vaquero! (1953) – Adam Smith
- The Long, Long Trailer (1954) – Uncle Edgar
- Living It Up (1954) – Isaiah Jackson
- Destry (1954) – Henry Skinner
- Stranger on Horseback (1955) – Vince Webb
- Interrupted Melody (1955) – Jim Owens
- The Desperate Hours (1955) – George Patterson (uncredited)
- Glory (1956) – Doc Brock
- The Fastest Gun Alive (1956) – Blind Man (uncredited)
- You Can't Run Away from It (1956) – 1st Proprietor
- Oklahoma Territory (1960) – Ward Harlan
- Wild in the Country (1961) – Mr. Spangler (uncredited)
- Hemingway's Adventures of a Young Man (1962) – Conductor (uncredited)
- Cheyenne Autumn (1964) – Jeremy Wright (uncredited)
- Petticoat Junction (1964–1970, TV Series) – Grandpappy Miller, Grandpa Miller
- Rosemary's Baby (1968) – Mr. Wees (uncredited)
- Hail, Hero! (1969) – Nat Winder
