= Kendall Clark =

Kendall Clark (February 5, 1912 – January 28, 1983) was an American actor of stage and screen.

== Early life and education ==
Henry Kendall Clark was born in Chicago, Illinois on February 5, 1912. He grew up in La Grange, Illinois. He was educated at the University of Wisconsin (UW). He starred in several plays put on at UW's Bascom Hall Theater including The Perfect Alibi (1930, as Jimmy Ludgrove) and George Bernard Shaw's Caesar and Cleopatra (1933, Britannus). He also starred in musicals put on by the UW's Haresfoot Club in the early 1930s.

== Career ==
In 1934–1935 season Clark toured in Eva Le Gallienne's troupe performing a minor role in Edmond Rostand's L'Aiglon; including an appearance at Brooklyn Academy of Music. He remained with her company for the 1935–1936 season; performing as Gustave in Dumas's Camille (translated by Henriette Alice McCrea Metcalf). This production toured to Broadway's Shubert Theatre in December 1935. He also appeared with Le Gallienne's troupe at the Shubert that month as Juanita in the Quintero brothers's A Sunny Morning (an English translation of Mañana de sol by Harley Granville-Barker).

In 1938-1939 Broadway season he played the main protagonist, Wade Barnett, in Theodore Pratt's The Big Blow at Maxine Elliott's Theatre. In 1945 he returned to Broadway as Major Dennis Robinson Jr in Arthur Laurents's Home of the Brave at the Belasco Theatre. He starred opposite Tallulah Bankhead as Maxim in The Eagle Has Two Heads at the Plymouth Theatre in 1947. He portrayed Harry Carson in the original cast of Joseph Hayes's The Desperate Hours (1955, Ethel Barrymore Theatre). In 1957 he portrayed Hortensio in a revival of The Taming of the Shrew at the Phoenix Theatre. That same year he played M. Lindsay Woolsey in the first national tour of Auntie Mame.

In 1961 Clark performed in several plays at Arena Stage in Washington D.C.; including Topman in Tiger at the Gates, Mendoza/The Devil in Man and Superman, the President in The Madwoman of Chaillot, Professor Serebryakov in Uncle Vanya, Lodovico in Othello, Mog Edwards in Under Milk Wood, Juror 4 in Twelve Angry Men, Smith in The Threepenny Opera, and the Governor in The Caucasian Chalk Circle. By the end of his career, he had performed in more than 200 stage plays.

On television Clark starred in the one-off drama The Last War (now lost) which was broadcast on NBC in November 1946. In 1949 he portrayed Prince Escalus is a television version of Romeo and Juliet broadcast on NBC Drama Theatre with Kevin McCarthy as Romeo. He also made appearances as a guest actor on the series Suspense (1954), Big Town (1955) Perry Mason (1966), and Days of Our Lives (1968). His film credits included The Shrike (1955, as Dr. Bellman), Six Bridges to Cross (1955, as Mr. Sanborn), Away All Boats (1956, Lieut. Jackson), and Damn Citizen (1958, as Col. Tom Hastings).

== Later life ==
After retiring from performance he settled in Vero Beach, Florida where he worked part time for The Moorings Yacht & Country Club.

Clark died in Vero Beach on 28 January 1983.
