= Mercy Island =

1941 film by William Morgan

- Directed by: William Morgan
- Written by: Malcolm Stuart Boylan; Theodore Pratt (novel)
- Produced by: Armand Schaefer
- Starring: Ray Middleton; Gloria Dickson; Otto Kruger
- Cinematography: Reggie Lanning
- Edited by: Ernest J. Nims
- Music by: Walter Scharf (Music by-uncredited); Cy Feuer (music director); Mort Glickman (orchestrator-uncredited); Herman Hand (additional orchestrator-uncredited)
- Production company: Republic Pictures
- Distributed by: Republic Pictures
- Release date: October 10, 1941
- Running time: 72 minutes
- Country: United States
- Language: English

Mercy Island is a 1941 American drama film directed by William Morgan and starring Ray Middleton, Gloria Dickson and Otto Kruger. It was nominated at the 14th Academy Awards, held in 1941, for Best Score of a Dramatic Picture, for which Walter Scharf and Cy Feuer received nominations.

== Plot ==
A young man takes his wife and a friend on a fishing trip to the Florida Keys on a boat owned by local Conks. Following a blow on the head when their boat hits a shallow bottom and loses its propeller, the husband becomes mentally unstable and believes his wife is having an affair.

== Cast ==
- Ray Middleton as Warren Ramsey
- Gloria Dickson as Leslie Ramsey
- Otto Kruger as Dr. Sanderson
- Donald Douglas as Clay Foster
- Forrester Harvey as Captain Lowe
- Terry Kilburn as Wiccy
