= Springs Mills Building =

Office skyscraper in Manhattan, New York

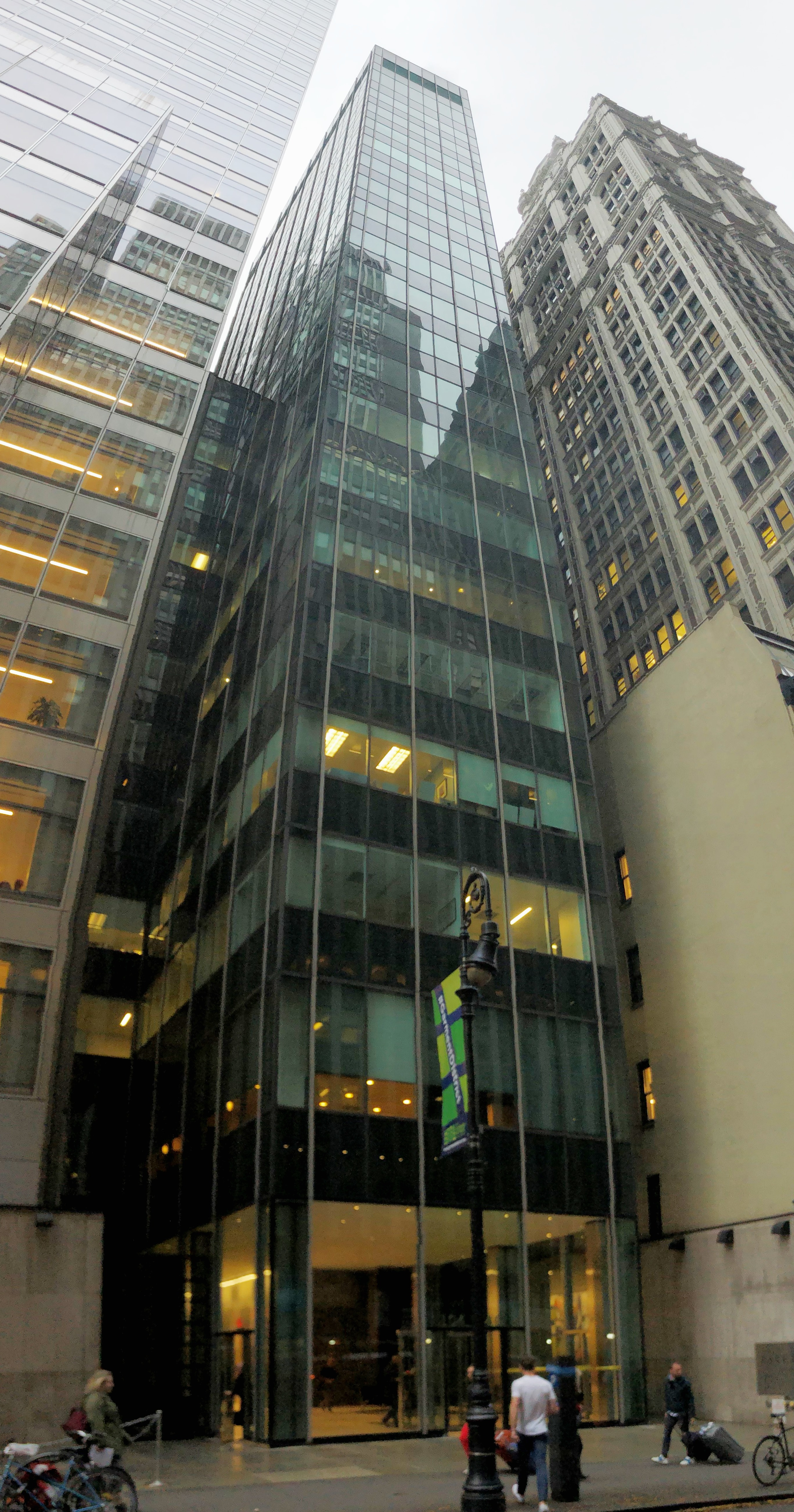
- 40th Street facade (2019)
- Interactive map of the Springs Mills Building area

General information
- Location: 104 West 40th Street; Manhattan, New York City
- Coordinates: 40°45′13″N 73°59′09″W

Technical details
- Floor count: 21

Design and construction
- Architect: Charles H. Abby of Harrison & Abramovitz

New York City Landmark
- Designated: April 13, 2010
- Reference no.: 2385

The Springs Mills Building is a 21-story office building at 104 West 40th Street in Manhattan, New York City, just west of Sixth Avenue and Bryant Park. The Modernist building sits on an L-shaped lot that extends back to 39th Street and rises to a thin glass hexagonal tower. An early example of the International Style in New York, the building was designed by the architectural firm Harrison & Abramovitz and built in 1961–1963. Its northern facade on 40th Street is designed to comply with the 1961 Zoning Resolution, enacted soon after the building's construction started, while its southern facade on 39th Street conforms to the older 1916 Zoning Resolution.

The tower was built for Springs Mills, Inc., of Lancaster County, South Carolina. The Springs Mills Company only occupied one-fourth of its namesake building; the remaining space was taken up by other textile manufacturers. The building was purchased by RFR Holding in 1999 and subsequently passed to several owners, ultimately being sold to Princeton International Properties in 2012. The building was designated an official city landmark by the New York City Landmarks Preservation Commission (LPC) in 2010.

== History ==
The tower was built for Springs Mills, Inc., of Lancaster County, South Carolina. The company was the United States' largest manufacturer of bedsheets and pillow cases when the Springs Mills Building was built. Its first factory was opened by Samuel Elliott White in 1887 in Fort Mill, South Carolina. White's son-in-law Leroy Springs created the even larger Lancaster Cotton Mill in Lancaster, South Carolina, in the 1890s. The plants later merged under Leroy's control, and his son Elliot W. Springs continued to expand the operations of the company, opening numerous sales offices including the Springs Mills Building. Springs Mills was renamed Springs Global in the 1980s and was merged with a Brazilian company in 2001. It remains among the largest textile manufacturers in the world and includes the brands Springmaid and Wamsutta.

In 1945, Springs Mills opened a sales office at 200 Church Street in Tribeca, Lower Manhattan, which continued to operate until 1959. By the 1950s, textile manufacturers were moving away from their traditional hub in Tribeca, centered around Worth Street. Meanwhile, the formerly blighted Sixth Avenue had become attractive for textile manufacturers, and by 1956 numerous textile companies were erecting skyscrapers in the area around Bryant Park between 40th and 42nd Streets, just southeast of Times Square. These companies included Lowenstein & Sons, which erected a 22-story office building at 1430 Broadway on the block between 39th and 40th Streets, and Deering Milliken & Co., which constructed their seven-story headquarters at 1045 Sixth Avenue.

=== Planning and construction ===
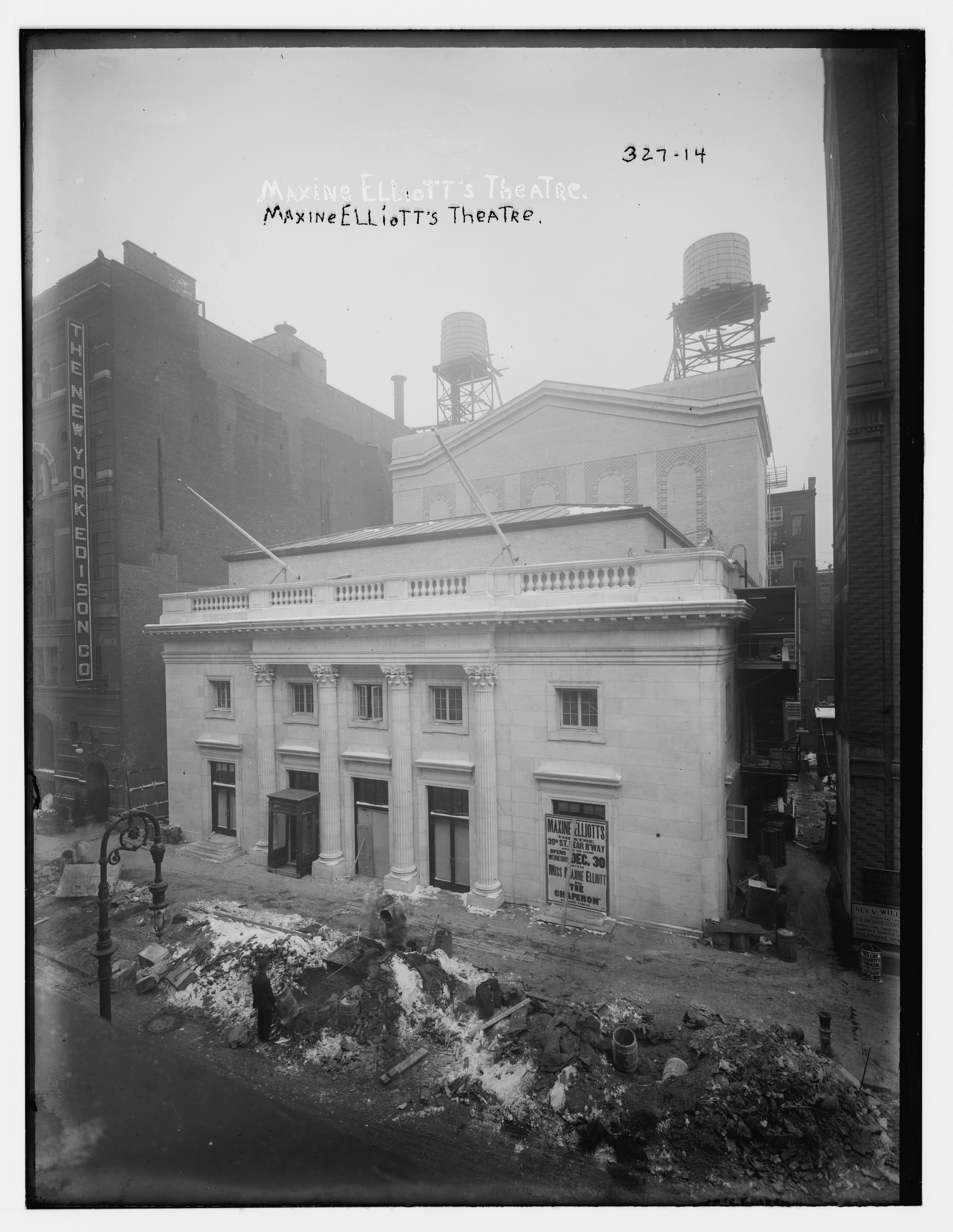
Maxine Elliott's Theatre which formerly occupied part of the building's site

Plans for a 19-floor building occupying the plots at 107-113 West 39th Street and 104-106 West 40th Street were announced in January 1960 by the Cardiff Corporation. At the time, the site was occupied by five structures, including the neoclassical-style Maxine Elliott's Theatre. These plots were acquired in May 1960, and Emery Roth & Sons were designated as the building's architects. At the time, the building was to be completed in late 1961. However, in late December 1960, Springs Mills bought the plot, which resulted in a delay in construction. In February 1961, Springs Mills bought an additional plot of land at 102 West 40th Street. With Harrison & Abramovitz selected as the architects, the updated plans were filed with the New York City Department of Buildings by June. Excavations had started by the time the revised plan for the Springs Mills Tower was announced to the public that November.

The George A. Fuller Company was named as the project's general contractor. Because of the building's location along narrow streets in Midtown, the Fuller Company was faced with numerous logistical issues due to the lack of loading areas on either 39th or 40th Streets. According to The New York Times, as a way to reduce congestion, materials were lifted directly from trucks, which parked at "the exact place in the building where [the materials] will be used". Construction progressed quickly, and the steel structure had been completed by August 1962. The Springs Mills Building opened in February 1963, coinciding with the company's 75th anniversary. A ten-day celebration with a fashion show and an art-and-photography exhibit was held, and a delegation from South Carolina went to tour the new building.

=== Use ===
The Springs Mills Company only occupied one-fourth of its namesake building, about 45,000 ft^{2} (4,200 m^{2}) spread over four floors. The remaining space was taken up by other textile manufacturers. By December 1963, ten companies had signed leases for space in the building. The Beacon Manufacturing Company, which sold blankets, signed a lease for the 39th Street storefront in 1964 and used it for a sales headquarters. Later tenants would come to include the Morocco National Tourist Office, as well as law firms and software companies.

In August 1999, RFR Holding bought the Springs Mills Building. Principal Financial Group Inc. and Mermel & McLain bought the building in 2007 for $140 million and subsequently made $15 million worth of improvements to the tower. After the 2008 financial crisis, the partnership accumulated $55 million in debt, including a $46 million mortgage that they had defaulted on. The building was made an official city landmark in April 2010. That November, the Springs Mills Building was sold to real-estate investment firm Savanna Fund for $61.7 million, a price that also included the mortgage. At the time, the building had 150,000 square feet (14,000 m^{2}) of vacant space; only about 25% of the building was occupied. Savanna sold the building to Princeton International Properties in 2012 for $105 million, at which point it was 70% occupied.

== Architecture ==
The planning process was primarily supervised by Max Abramovitz. However, much of the design work was performed by Charles Howson Abbe (1909–1993). Abbe worked with William Lescaze, one of the first architects to design American buildings in the European modernist style, in the 1930s. Abbe's other works included the Corning Glass Building; LaGuardia Airport's main terminal in Queens; the U.S. Steel Tower in Pittsburgh; and the United Nations International School at Kips Bay, Manhattan.

The building's design was impacted by contemporary architectural tastes, a change to zoning ordinances during its construction, and its location within the middle of a block (though the site is much closer to Sixth Avenue than to the other end of the block at Broadway). The lot is roughly L-shaped, with the longer side along 39th Street and the shorter side along 40th Street. The 39th Street side is designed according to the 1916 Zoning Resolution while the 40th Street side conforms to the 1961 Zoning Resolution.

At the time of the tower's construction, the surrounding buildings were relatively short. The Springs Mills Building was abutted on the west by the six-story 108 West 40th Street, which in turn was next to a 25-story building called the World's Tower. Its eastern facade was adjacent to 1057 Sixth Avenue and the Deering Milliken Company Building, which were respectively six and seven stories, giving the building's upper floors a view of Bryant Park. These buildings are now the site of 7 Bryant Park, a 450-foot-tall (140 m) structure built in the 2010s, whose presence blocks the view of Bryant Park.

=== Form ===
Graph of the 1916 New York City zoning ordinance with an example elevation for an 80-foot street in a 2½-times height district

Because the 1961 Zoning Ordinance went into effect during the building's construction, the 39th and 40th Street elevations contain different massings. On the 39th Street side, the base of the building is located right along the lot line, and there are setbacks at the 6th and 12th floors. These setbacks provided sufficient sunlight to the street, and were mandated in the 1916 ordinance. However, the 40th Street side does not contain any setbacks. Instead, that entire portion of the building is recessed from the street, and a plaza is located in front of the main entrance. Even though the presence of a plaza would result in less office space compared to setbacks, it was also seen as a feature that would increase the prominence of the building and the "prestige" of its owners. As such, many late-1950s buildings incorporated plazas rather than setbacks.

The Springs Mills Building's permits were approved before the 1961 Zoning Ordinance took effect. Nonetheless, it incorporates elements of both zoning ordinances. According to the LPC, the design of the 40th Street side "looked towards the future" with its plaza and a slab-like form that rises vertically without interruption. The 39th Street side's design, with its base that abuts onto the sidewalk and multiple setbacks, better resembled the old ordinances.

The building's upper section, above the 13th floor, has a floor plan like an "elongated hexagon" with the longer section aligned north–south. The widest portion of the hexagonal tower is in the middle of the block, while the narrowest portion is along the 39th and 40th Street elevations. The hexagonal shape may have been inspired by Le Corbusier's plans for a redesigned Algiers street grid and the headquarters of the United Nations, as well as the designs of the hexagonal Pirelli Tower and the octagonal MetLife Building.

=== Facade ===
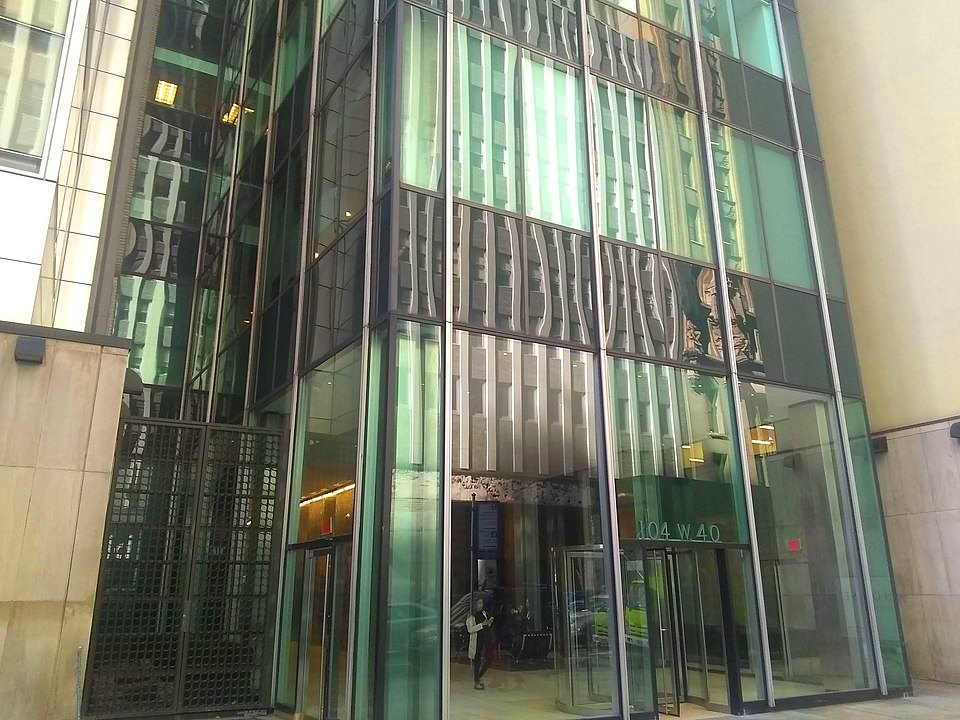
The lower portion of the facade. Vertical silver mullions can be seen here, protruding from the building. The black-colored spandrels are located in the space between the green-tinted windows on each floor

The building's facade is an early example of a glass curtain wall, a non-structural facade in front of the steel structural frame. Its design incorporated elements from similar nearby projects such as the United Nations Secretariat Building at First Avenue (1947), Lever House at Park Avenue (1950–1952), and the Corning Glass Building at Fifth Avenue (1959). The Secretariat Building had used double-glazed green-tinted glass, while the Lever House used both glazed fixed-panel windows as well as interspersed sections of tinted-green and dark-green glass. The Corning Glass Building, another Harris and Abramovitz project, used sheets of "translucent glass in front of painted metal panels" as well as interlocking mullions made of aluminum.

The Springs Mills Building's elements were most similar to the Corning Glass Building's, using mullions in two shades of gray to subdivide the facade into a grid with vertical bays. There are two windows per bay on each floor except for the first, and below each window in the space between each floor, there are two spandrels that align with the windows. Vertical silver mullions, which separate each of the bays, protrude slightly from the facade. As with the Corning Glass Building, these projecting mullions have the impression of an "elegant vertical direction" and also serve as anchors for window washers' carts. The remaining mullions are dark-gray and are flush with the facade. Vertical dark-gray mullions separate the windows as well as the spandrels in each bay, while horizontal mullions delineate the boundaries between the windows and the mullions. The window panes are anti-glare panels created by PPG Industries (formerly the Pittsburgh Plate Glass Company), who claimed that the panes would absorb heat and reduce fatigue to the eyes. The penthouse level contains mechanical rooms, which are located behind a facade of louvered metal panels.

The building's two entrances are at 39th and 40th Streets, on its southern and northern sides respectively, and are connected by a passageway inside. At 39th Street, the building is 100 feet (30 m) wide. The ground-level entrance is located on the right (or eastern) side, and there are two storefronts. The storefronts are slightly set back behind a set of four columns, which support the floor directly above it. The entrance, set back within a breezeway, contained revolving doors with metal characters spelling out "109 W. 39", the building's alternate address. A terrazzo ramp leads to the lobby. A loading dock is located on the left (western) side of the 39th Street elevation.

Conversely, the 40th Street entrance is located in the center of the facade, behind the plaza. The entrance contains revolving doors that are recessed from the facade of the building, within the lobby. The plaza on the northern side contains limestone-paneled walls and travertine tiling. Initially, it contained metal signs with Springs Mills' company name on the western and eastern walls of the plaza, as well as a small display box of the company's products on the western wall. Metal light fixtures hang from the top of the walls. The plaza was arranged in a minimalist fashion and included tiny plants and rocks. In the original plans, there were two small planters and a black granite plant box on the eastern portion of the plaza, as well as two trapezoidal planters flanking the entrance.

== See also ==
- List of New York City Designated Landmarks in Manhattan from 14th to 59th Streets
