= Enemies of the Law =

- Directed by: Lawrence C. Windom
- Written by: C.R. Jones
- Produced by: Samuel S. Krellberg
- Starring: Mary Nolan; Johnnie Walker; Lou Tellegen
- Cinematography: Frank Zucker
- Edited by: Russell G. Shields
- Production company: Regal Talking Pictures
- Distributed by: Regal Talking Pictures
- Release date: July 21, 1931
- Running time: 76 minutes
- Country: United States
- Language: English

Enemies of the Law is a 1931 American crime film directed by Lawrence C. Windom and starring Mary Nolan, Johnnie Walker and Lou Tellegen.

== Cast ==
- Mary Nolan as Florence Vinton
- Johnnie Walker as Larry Marsh
- Lou Tellegen as Eddie Swan
- Harold Healy as Jack
- Alan Brooks as Lefty
- Dewey Robinson as Tony Catello
- John Dunsmuir as The Big Shot
- Danny Hardin as Joey Regan
- Bert West as Babe Ricardo
- Gordon Westcott as Blackie
- Doe Doe Green as Booker T

== Bibliography ==
- Wagner, Laura. Hollywood's Hard-Luck Ladies. McFarland, 2020.
