= Springs Global =

Brazil-based home furnishings company

Springs Global Participações S.A.
- Type: Sociedade Anônima
- Traded as: B3: SGPS3
- Industry: Textile
- Founded: 2005
- Headquarters: Montes Claros, Brazil
- Key people: Josué Christiano Gomes da Silva, (Chairman & CEO)
- Revenue: ▲US$ 820.8 million (2012)
- Net income: ▼ - US$ 70.3 million (2012)
- Number of employees: 3,980
- Parent: Coteminas
- Website: www.springs.com

Springs Global is a Brazil-based multinational corporation engaged in the manufacturing, marketing, and sale of packaged textile and non-textile home furnishings. It makes textile goods, such as sheets, pillows, bedspreads, towels and bath rugs, under the Springmaid and Wamsutta brands. Other well-known brands from Springs Global include Regal, Beaulieu, Bali, and Nanik. It operates in Argentina, Mexico, Brazil, Canada and the U.S. and has about 30 manufacturing units in 13 states of the U.S.

The previous owner, Springs Industries, combined its home textile operations with Brazil's Coteminas, and the main manufacturing operations were moved to South America from Lancaster County, South Carolina, where the original plant had provided jobs for nearly one-third of the county's population. After the relocation of manufacturing to Brazil, the resulting structure left the renamed Springs Global US to work alongside Coteminas as the operating units of parent Springs Global; most manufacturing decisions and control originate from the Montes Claros headquarters, while executive control is in the U.S.

== History of Springs Industries ==
In 1887, Samuel Elliott White and others started Fort Mill Manufacturing Co. in Fort Mill, South Carolina. The plant opened in 1888. At one time, the plant employed 2000 and was the largest producer of fabric for bed sheets in the world, but in 1983 when it closed, only 200 still worked there. The White Plant in Fort Mill opened in 1892.

In 1895, Leroy Springs and others started Lancaster Cotton Mill in Lancaster, South Carolina. Springs also bought the Chester and Cheraw Railroad, renaming it the Lancaster and Chester Railroad, or L&C. Lancaster had the largest print cloth factory in the world in 1939.

In 1948, Springs opened the Grace Plant on the Catawba River near Lancaster at the site of a former locomotive shop. The company made consumer products for the first time.

In 1959, Elliott Springs died and H.W. Close became president of The Springs Cotton Mills and Springs Mills Inc., adding new plants and products and making Springs a publicly traded company in 1966. A new sales office in New York City, the Springs Mills Building, opened in 1963.

In 1962, Springs announced a warehouse complex in Fort Lawn, which was followed by the Elliott Plant and the Frances Plant. 650 people worked at the three operations. The warehouses could hold cotton worth more than $19 million.

The Katherine Plant in Chester opened in 1968.

In October 1985, Springs announced the $265 million acquisition of New York City-based M. Lowenstein, the largest merger ever in the textile industry, making Springs the no. 3 publicly held textile company in the United States, as well as the largest maker of sheets with a quarter of the market. The deal gave Springs the premium Wamsutta brand. Springs had previously been considered a possible buyer of Cannon Mills.

On October 21, 1986, Crosland-Erwin Associates and Springs chairman Walter Elisha announced plans for an outlet mall in the Fort Mill plant. The project turned out to be too expensive and it was tainted by the Heritage USA scandal. The Fort Mill plant burned June 28, 1988.

Springs was the largest industrial employer in South Carolina with $1.7 billion in sales in 1987 and 23,500 employees at 39 plants in six states plus Belgium, England and Japan. About 18,000 people worked at 24 plants in South Carolina.

Springs was the largest employer in Chester County, South Carolina when on May 2, 1988, the company announced a $12 million plant in Fort Lawn to make comforters, draperies and other bedroom items. With 325 new jobs, the county would have 4000 people working for Springs. Already, Springs made bedspreads at the Riverlawn Plant in Fort Lawn.

In August 1988, Springs announced that 200 jobs would be lost at its 93-year-old Lancaster complex. This would reduce the number of employees to 1300, down from 4500 in 1981. The number of fly shuttle looms was reduced during the same period from 7000 to 300.

On October 20, 1988, Springs announced plans to spend $370 million over the next two years on modernization, as well as closing or selling some plants. This would include the Home Furnishings and Industrial Fabrics groups. Already, the White Plant in Fort Mill and the Katherine Plant in Chester were getting $20 million in improvements each, while in Lancaster, 200 jobs were being dropped as a weaving process was ended, and 179 lost their jobs in Anderson, South Carolina with the closing of the Lyons Plant.

In 1989, Springs opened the Close Plant in Fort Mill.

On February 18, 1998 Springs announced it would close the dye and printing plant opened in Rock Hill in 1929 by M. Lowenstein & Sons, laying off 480. 5000 people had worked there at one point.

== Merger with Coteminas ==
Springs began its association with Brazil-based Coteminas in 2001, when the Close family took the company private. That year, Springs and Coteminas began a "[s]trategic long-term alliance."

In 2002, Springs bought the Beaulieu accent rug business including its Dalton, Georgia and Stratford, Ontario operations, and the Burlington Industries window treatment and bedding businesses.

In 2003, 500 workers lost their jobs when the White Plant and the Lancaster Plant closed, and 130 more Grace Plant workers also were let go.

In 2004, Springs closed the 1920s Lyman, South Carolina and 1960s Anderson, South Carolina plants acquired in 1985.

On January 1, 2005, global textile quotas ended, allowing countries where employers paid their workers less than U.S. companies to ship more products.

Early in the year, the Elliott Plant in Fort Lawn closed and 450 were laid off at the Grace Plant.

In October 2005, Springs announced its home furnishings operations would merge with Coteminas, in an effort to lower costs, stay competitive and keep as many jobs as possible. Springs still had around 1000 workers at two Chester County plants. With manufacturing at 13 plants in Brazil and Argentina, Springs could have sheets and towels in stores faster than if production was done in China. Springs and Coteminas would each own half of Springs Global, and Springs would continue to make Springmaid and Wamsutta products.

After spending $10 million improving the Katherine Plant in 2005, Springs announced machinery from there would be moved to South America, and 700 would lose their jobs by February 2007, despite their claims of keeping job. Also, the Frances Plant in Fort Lawn was closing in December 2006, with 60 jobs lost.

On June 27, 2007 Springs said that after 120 years, Springs would end manufacturing in South Carolina with the closing of its Grace and Close plants. The state would still have about 700 employees, most of them at distribution centers in Lancaster and Fort Lawn, and at the Fort Mill offices.
