= The Patriots (play) =

The Patriots is a play written in a prologue and three acts by Sidney Kingsley in 1943. It won the New York Drama Critics' Circle award for Best Play, and ran for 173 performances.

== Synopsis ==
Thomas Jefferson has just returned from France, hoping to relax with his daughters at Monticello. George Washington however, has a favor to ask of him. Hit by tough political opposition, specifically afraid of rising monarch strength, he urges Jefferson to become his Secretary of State. Jefferson accepts, albeit grudgingly. Not long after, he is battling his archrival, Alexander Hamilton, a Federalist just before his election in 1800.

== Details ==
The show played at the National Theatre and was directed by Shepard Traube (1907–1983), produced by Playwrights' Company and Rowland Stebbins, music by Stanley Bate, scenic design by Howard Bay, costume design by Rose Bogdanoff and Toni Ward, and lighting design by Moe Hack.

The cast on opening night was:

- Roland Alexander as Mr. Fenno
- Leslie Bingham as Mrs. Conrad
- Francis Compton as Colonel Humphrey
- Thomas Dillon as Jacob
- Madge Evans as Patsy
- Doe Doe Green as Jupiter
- Cecil Humphreys as George Washington
- House Jameson as Alexander Hamilton
- Raymond Edward Johnson as Thomas Jefferson
- Peg La Centra as Mrs. Hamilton
- Judson Laire as James Monroe
- Robert Lance as Butler
- Hope Lange as Anne Randolph
- Jack Lloyd as George Washington Lafayette
- Ross Matthew as Doctor
- George Mitchell as Ned
- Henry Mowbray as Henry Knox
- Billy Nevard as Thomas Jefferson Randolph
- Frances Reid as Martha
- Byron Russell as Captain
- John Souther as James Madison
- Victor Southwick as Sergeant
- John Stephen as Frontiersman
- Philip White as Mat

== Adaptations ==
The play has been presented on television twice, by NBC in 1963 (starring Charlton Heston as Thomas Jefferson, John Fraser as Alexander Hamilton, and Howard St. John as George Washington) and in 1976 by PBS (starring Robert Murch as Thomas Jefferson, Philip LeStrange as Alexander Hamilton, and Ralph Clanton as George Washington), but it has never been made into a theatrical film.

Ironically, the first telecast, in 1963, took place on November 15, one week before the assassination of President John F. Kennedy. The 1976 telecast is available on DVD.
