= Rachel and the Stranger =

1948 film

- Directed by: Norman Foster
- Screenplay by: Waldo Salt
- Based on: Rachel a 1945 story by Howard Fast
- Produced by: Richard H. Berger
- Starring: Loretta Young; William Holden; Robert Mitchum
- Cinematography: Maury Gertsman
- Edited by: Les Millbrook
- Music by: Roy Webb
- Color process: Black and white
- Distributed by: RKO
- Release dates: September 18, 1948 (Premiere-New York City); October 2, 1948 (U.S.)
- Running time: 93 minutes
- Country: United States
- Language: English
- Box office: $2.4 million (US rentals)

Rachel and the Stranger is a 1948 American historical film starring Loretta Young, William Holden, and Robert Mitchum. Directed by Norman Foster and adapted by Waldo Salt from the Howard Fast short story "Rachel", it is one of the few films to address the role of women in the early American frontier, as well as portray early America's indentured servant trade. While the film had a low budget, it was RKO's most successful film of 1948, making $395,000.

== Plot ==
In early America, David Harvey, a recent widower farming in the wilderness of the Northwest Territory, decides he needs a woman around to help raise his son, Davey, so he travels to the nearest settlement and consults with Parson Jackson and his wife about what to do. In view of the dearth of women in the settlement, it is decided that David will buy the contract of an indentured servant named Rachel, and she will keep house and care for Davey. David agrees to marry Rachel, but the marriage is in name only, as he is still grieving his dead wife, Susan. Davey resents what he sees as an attempt to replace his mother, and Rachel feels unwelcome in her new home. When she learns that Susan was skilled in the use of a musket, Rachel resolves to secretly teach herself to shoot, hoping it will help her connect with Davey and, through him, David.

Jim Fairways, a hunter who is a friend of David, visits the Harveys on his way to the settlement, and his obvious attraction to Rachel causes David to begin to see her differently. After selling his furs, Jim returns to the farm with presents, including a dress for Rachel, and stays for weeks, during which time David becomes increasingly jealous and irritated by Jim's flirtatious behavior.

Eventually, David schedules a night out hunting foxes with the dogs to get Jim alone. He encourages his friend to resume his nomadic lifestyle, but Jim says he may be ready to settle down. Meanwhile, Davey defies Rachel by sitting outside the cabin to listen to the sounds of the hunt. When a prowling mountain lion threatens him and the livestock, Rachel shoots it, impressing the men and Davey.

As he prepares to leave the farm, Jim offers to buy Rachel from David. David refuses, and the friends come to blows. Rachel is furious, saying that both men regard her more as a commodity than as a wife, and she decides to return to the settlement. The men and Davey follow her, but she refuses to change her mind.

While the quartet is camped in the woods that night, they see a glow in the sky. Fearing the Shawnee are on the warpath, David and Jim tell Rachel and Davey to go to the settlement, while they return to the cabin to see if everything is alright. After traveling for a bit, Rachel feels compelled to turn back, and sends Davey on for help alone. She finds the farm besieged by Shawnee warriors, and is dragged from her horse by one, but David and Jim save her and get her into the cabin. The trio put up a valiant defense until the Shawnee are able to set the cabin on fire, at which point the defenders retreat to the cellar.

Early the next morning, Parson Jackson and the local militia arrive and drive off the attackers. Jim goes with the militia to chase the Shawnee. David and Rachel survey the burnt-out cabin, making plans for the future. Rachel knows she has finally been accepted as part of the family when David tells his son to "do as your ma says", and he and Rachel kiss.

== Cast ==
- Loretta Young as Rachel Harvey
- William Holden as David "Big Davey" Harvey
- Robert Mitchum as Jim Fairways
- Gary Gray as Davey Harvey
- Tom Tully as Parson Jackson
- Sara Haden as Mrs. Jackson
- Frank Ferguson as Mr. Green
- Walter Baldwin as Gallus
- Regina Wallace as Mrs. Green

== Production ==
Filming took place in Eugene, Oregon.

== Reception ==
After Robert Mitchum was arrested for possessing marijuana, RKO rushed to release Rachel and the Stranger to take advantage of the news. The film opened in seven key US cities to test the public's attitude, and it was welcomed by both critics and audiences. It was the number one film in the US for two weeks, and ultimately recorded a profit of $395,000.
