= List of 1948 box office number-one films in the United States =

This is a list of films which placed number one at the weekly box office in the United States during 1948.

== Number-one films ==
†	This implies the highest-grossing movie of the year.

#	Week ending	Film	Notes	Ref
1	January 7, 1948	Captain from Castile		
2	January 14, 1948	Road to Rio †	Road to Rio reached number one in its third week of release	
3	January 21, 1948	Road to Rio †		
4	January 28, 1948	The Treasure of the Sierra Madre	Treasure of the Sierra Madre reached number one in its second week of release.	
5	February 4, 1948	The Treasure of the Sierra Madre		
6	February 11, 1948	You Were Meant for Me	You Were Meant for Me reached number one in its second week of release	
7	February 18, 1948	To the Ends of the Earth		
8	February 25, 1948	The Voice of the Turtle	The Voice of the Turtle reached number one in its ninth week of release	
9	March 3, 1948	Call Northside 777	Call Northside 777 reached number one in its third week of release with a gross of $500,000 from 17 cities.	
10	March 10, 1948	Call Northside 777		
11	March 17, 1948	Saigon		
12	March 24, 1948	Gentleman's Agreement		
13	March 31, 1948	Sitting Pretty	Sitting Pretty reached number one in its third week of release	
14	April 7, 1948	The Naked City	The Naked City reached number one in its fifth week of release.	
15	April 14, 1948	The Naked City		
16	April 21, 1948	I Remember Mama	I Remember Mama reached number one in its sixth week of release	
17	April 28, 1948	The Big Clock	The Big Clock reached number one in its third week of release	
18	May 5, 1948	State of the Union	State of the Union grossed $578,000 from 21 key cities	
19	May 12, 1948	State of the Union		
20	May 19, 1948	The Iron Curtain	The Iron Curtain grossed over $500,000 from 20 key cities.	
21	May 26, 1948	The Iron Curtain		
22	June 2, 1948	Homecoming	Homecoming reached number one in its fifth week of release.	
23	June 9, 1948	Homecoming		
24	June 16, 1948	Homecoming		
25	June 23, 1948	Homecoming		
26	June 30, 1948	The Emperor Waltz	The Emperor Waltz reached number one in its fifth week of release	
27	July 7, 1948	The Emperor Waltz	The Emperor Waltz grossed over $400,000 for the week.	
28	July 14, 1948	The Emperor Waltz	The Emperor Waltz grossed $379,000 for the week.	
29	July 21, 1948	The Emperor Waltz		
30	July 28, 1948	Easter Parade	Easter Parade reached number one in its fourth week of release	
31	August 4, 1948	Key Largo		
32	August 11, 1948	Key Largo		
33	August 18, 1948	Key Largo		
34	August 25, 1948	A Date with Judy	A Date with Judy reached number one in its fourth week of release.	
35	September 1, 1948	A Date with Judy		
36	September 8, 1948	A Date with Judy		
37	September 15, 1948	A Date with Judy		
38	September 22, 1948	Rachel and the Stranger		
39	September 29, 1948	Rachel and the Stranger		
40	October 6, 1948	Sorry, Wrong Number		
41	October 13, 1948	Sorry, Wrong Number		
42	October 20, 1948	Johnny Belinda		
43	October 27, 1948	Apartment for Peggy		
44	November 3, 1948	Red River		
45	November 10, 1948	A Song Is Born		
46	November 17, 1948	Road House		
47	November 24, 1948	Julia Misbehaves		
48	December 1, 1948	When My Baby Smiles at Me	When My Baby Smiles at Me grossed nearly $560,000 from 19 key cities in its fourth week of release.	
49	December 8, 1948	The Three Musketeers		
50	December 15, 1948	When My Baby Smiles at Me	When My Baby Smiles at Me returned to number one in its sixth week of release.	
51	December 22, 1948	The Paleface		
52	December 29, 1948	The Paleface		

== See also ==
- Lists of American films — American films by year
- Lists of box office number-one films

== Chronology ==
Preceded by 1947	1948	Succeeded by 1949
