= The Barefoot Mailman =

1951 film by Earl McEvoy

- Film poster
- Directed by: Earl McEvoy
- Written by: James Gunn; Alfred Lewis Levitt; Francis Swann
- Based on: The Barefoot Mailman by Theodore Pratt
- Produced by: Robert Cohn
- Starring: Robert Cummings; Terry Moore; Jerome Courtland
- Cinematography: Ellis W. Carter
- Edited by: Aaron Stell
- Music by: George Duning
- Production company: Robert Cohn Productions
- Distributed by: Columbia Pictures
- Release dates: December 1, 1951 (Florida); January 24, 1952 (Los Angeles)
- Running time: 83 minutes
- Country: United States
- Language: English

The Barefoot Mailman is a 1951 American Super Cinecolor historical comedy adventure film produced by Robert Cohn, directed by Earl McEvoy, distributed by Columbia Pictures and starring Robert Cummings, Terry Moore and Jerome Courtland. It is based on the 1943 novel The Barefoot Mailman by Theodore Pratt. Filmed on location in Florida where the events take place, The Barefoot Mailman features many elements of the Western film genre.

== Plot ==
In 1895, confidence man Sylvanus Hurley is trying to raise the selling price of land that he owns by convincing the residents of Miami that a railroad is coming to town. Mailman Steven Pierton leads Sylvanus along the beach from Palm Beach to Miami, but he is skeptical of the scheme. Runaway teenager Adie Titus joins Sylvanus and Steven on their walk by impersonating a child.

== Cast ==
- Robert Cummings as Sylvanus Hurley
- Terry Moore as Adie Titus
- Jerome Courtland as Steven Pierton
- John Russell as Theron
- Will Geer as Dan Paget
- Arthur Shields as Ben Titus
- Trevor Bardette as Oat McCarty
- Arthur Space as Piggott
- Frank Ferguson as Doc Bethune
- Percy Helton as Dewey Durgan
- Ellen Corby as Miss Della
- Renie Riano as Miss Emily

== Production ==
The film is based on a 1943 novel written by Theodore Pratt that The New York Times called "salty and colorful." Pratt's idea for the story came when he saw a mural in a post office in West Palm Beach depicting barefoot mailmen in the early 1900s delivering mail between Miami and Palm Beach, a process that took three days.

In April 1950, Columbia revealed that Alfred Lewis Levitt was writing a screenplay based on the book for the studio. In September, the studio announced that most of the film would be shot in Florida starting on October 3. Cummings was cast in November 1950.

== Release ==
The Barefoot Mailman premiered simultaneously in the Florida cities of Miami, Miami Beach, Coral Gables, Fort Lauderdale and West Palm Beach on December 1, 1951. Author Theodore Pratt and actor Jerome Courtland appeared on stage at several cinemas before the showing of the film.

== Reception ==
In a contemporary review for The Philadelphia Inquirer, critic Mildred Martin wrote: "Since the humor isn't really funny enough and the drama incredible when it isn't downright dull, there's nothing to detain you very long about this one."

Reviewer Dorothy Masters of the New York Daily News wrote that the film "is neatly packaged and presented for entertainment value".
