= Sing While You Dance =

1946 film by D. Ross Lederman

- Lobby card
- Directed by: D. Ross Lederman
- Written by: Lorraine Edwards; Robert Stephen Brode
- Produced by: Leon Barsha
- Starring: Ellen Drew; Bob Haymes; Andrew Tombes
- Cinematography: Allen G. Siegler
- Edited by: Gene Havlick
- Music by: Paul Mertz
- Production company: Columbia Pictures
- Distributed by: Columbia Pictures
- Release date: July 25, 1946
- Running time: 72 minutes
- Country: United States
- Language: English

Sing While You Dance is a 1946 American musical comedy film directed by D. Ross Lederman and starring Ellen Drew, Bob Haymes, and Andrew Tombes. It was produced and distributed by Columbia Pictures.

== Cast ==
- Ellen Drew as Susan Kent
- Bob Haymes as Johnny Crane
- Andrew Tombes as Gorman
- Edwin Cooper as Davidson
- Robert Kellard as Buzz Nelson
- Ethel Griffies as Mrs. Abigail Smith
- Amanda Lane as Gloria Mundy
- Eddy Waller as Lem Aubrey
- Paul E. Burns as Willow
- Eddie Parks as Ramie Parks
- Bert Roach as Jerome Smith
- Mary Gordon as Mom Henderson
- Walter Baldwin as Handy
- Trevor Bardette as Dusty
- Jean Willes as Miss Flint
- Crystal Reeves as Miss Stillwell
- Gino Corrado as Henri
- Dick Winslow as Hep
- Virginia Hunter as Brenda
