= List of 1947 box office number-one films in the United States =

This is a list of films which placed number one at the weekly box office in the United States during 1947.

== Number-one films ==
This implies the highest-grossing movie of the year.

Week ending	Title	Notes	Ref
January 1	The Razor's Edge		
January 8	The Razor's Edge		
January 15	TBD	No survey published.	
January 22	13 Rue Madeleine		
January 29	13 Rue Madeleine		
February 5	The Jolson Story		
February 12	Humoresque		
February 19	The Shocking Miss Pilgrim		
February 26	The Jolson Story		
March 5	The Jolson Story		
March 12	The Beginning or the End		
March 19	The Best Years of Our Lives		
March 26	The Best Years of Our Lives		
April 2	The Best Years of Our Lives		
April 9	The Best Years of Our Lives		
April 16	The Best Years of Our Lives		
April 23	The Best Years of Our Lives		
April 30	The Sea of Grass		
May 7	The Egg and I		
May 14	Duel in the Sun		
May 21	Duel in the Sun		
May 28	Duel in the Sun		
June 4	Duel in the Sun		
June 11	Great Expectations		
June 18	Duel in the Sun		
June 25	Miracle on 34th Street	Variety named Duel in the Sun and Miracle on 34th Street as the pacemakers but the grosses listed in the survey for the latter were higher, including $94,000 from New York.	
July 2	The Unfaithful		
July 9	Fiesta		
July 16	The Perils of Pauline		
July 23	The Hucksters		
July 30	The Hucksters		
August 6	The Hucksters		
August 13	I Wonder Who's Kissing Her Now		
August 20	Welcome Stranger		
August 27	The Bachelor and the Bobby-Soxer		
September 3	The Bachelor and the Bobby-Soxer		
September 10	The Bachelor and the Bobby-Soxer		
September 17	Life with Father		
September 24	Life with Father		
October 1	Life with Father		
October 8	Life with Father		
October 15	The Foxes of Harrow		
October 22	The Foxes of Harrow		
October 29	Forever Amber		
November 5	Forever Amber		
November 12	Forever Amber		
November 19	Body and Soul		
November 26	Body and Soul		
December 3	Green Dolphin Street		
December 10	Green Dolphin Street		
December 17	Green Dolphin Street		
December 24	Unconquered		
December 31	Captain from Castile		

== Highest-grossing films ==
The highest-grossing films during the calendar year based on theatrical rentals were as follows:

Rank	Title	Distributor	Rental
1	Duel in the Sun	Selznick Releasing Organization	$12,500,000
2	Forever Amber	20th Century-Fox	$8,500,000
3	Unconquered	Paramount Pictures	$8,000,000
4	Road to Rio	Paramount Pictures	$6,500,000
5	Captain from Castile	20th Century-Fox	$6,500,000
6	Life with Father	Warner Bros.	$6,000,000
7	The Bachelor and the Bobby-Soxer	RKO Radio Pictures	$5,000,000
8	Welcome Stranger	Paramount Pictures	$4,750,000
9	Gentleman's Agreement	20th Century-Fox	$4,500,000
10	Green Dolphin Street	Metro-Goldwyn-Mayer	$4,500,000

== Chronology ==
Preceded by 1946	1947	Succeeded by 1948
