= The Big Blow (play) =

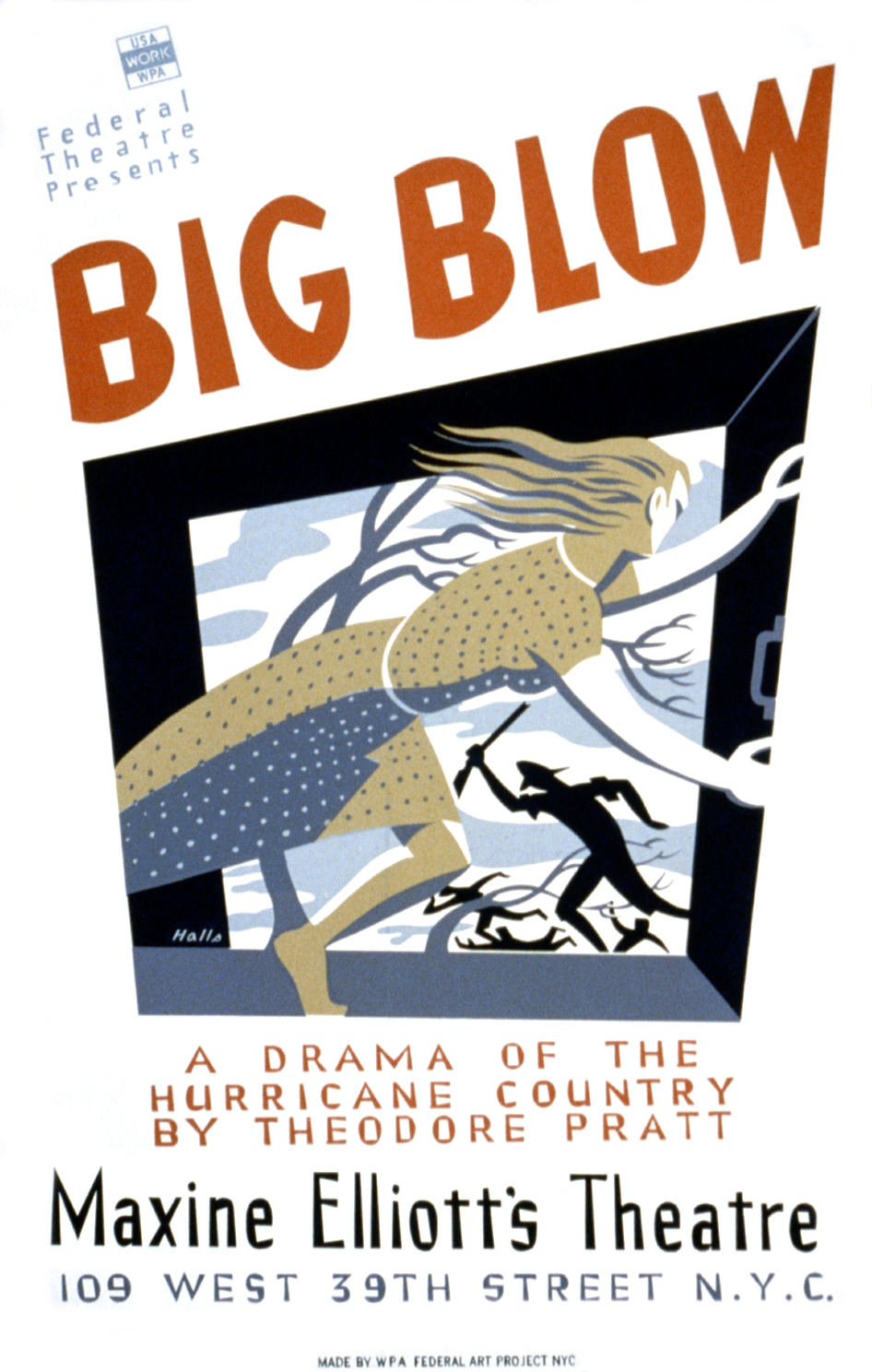
1938 poster for the Broadway production of The Big Blow. Designed by Richard Halls.

The Big Blow is a play in 3 act and five scenes by playwright Theodore Pratt. It was adapted from his 1936 novel of the same name. It played on Broadway in the 1938-1939 season.

== Plot ==
Wade Barnett is a young college educated farmer from Nebraska who relocates with his mother, Sarah Barnett, and her sister, Aunt Jane Barnett, to a farm in Florida. Wade purchased the land site unseen. He does this to move his sick mother who has a heart condition into a better climate for her health. Upon arrival he finds the land not as described, and that he has been swindled into purchasing an inferior piece of property. Additionally, he comes into conflict with the local Florida crackers led by Carney Jelks who distrust a "Yankee" and resent his presence.

Wade preservers and builds a log cabin on the property to replace the old shack that was in disrepair. He befriends Celie Partin, a white orphan girl, and her devoted black caretaker, Clay. Carney Jelks lusts after Celie and is aggressive in his sexual advances towards her. He is stopped by Clay. Carney gathers the Florida crackers with the intent of forming a mob to lynch Clay; appealing to racist sentiment. Pursued by Carney and his mob of crackers, Celie and Clay seek safety in Wade's cabin which becomes surrounded. As tensions mount, a hurricane hits the coast of Florida imperilling the safety of the mob outside the Cabin. Taking pity on them, Wade lets them into his home, saving their lives. Carney tries to whip up the mob against them, but the crowd's mood has shifted and they turn on Carney, killing him.

== Performance history ==
The Big Blow was staged on Broadway at Maxine Elliott's Theatre where it opened on October 1, 1938. It ran there for a total of 157 performance; closing on April 1, 1939. It was produced by Morris Ankrum and George Brewer for the Federal Theatre Project (FTP). The play was later produced by the FTP at both the Mayan Theater in Los Angeles and the Great Northern Theatre in Chicago in 1939.

The Broadway production of The Big Blow was directed by Anton Bundsmann and used music by Hans Bruno Meyer. Designers for the play included Samuel Leve (sets), Mary Merrill (costumes), and Abe Feder (lighting). The cast was led by Kendall Clark who played Wade Barnett. Others in the cast included Edwin Cooper as Carney Jelks, Doe Doe Green as Clay, Amelia Romano as Celie, Dorothy Raymond as Sarah Barnett, and Elizabeth Malone as Aunt Jane Barnett among others.
