= USS Randall =

1944 Haskell-class attack transport

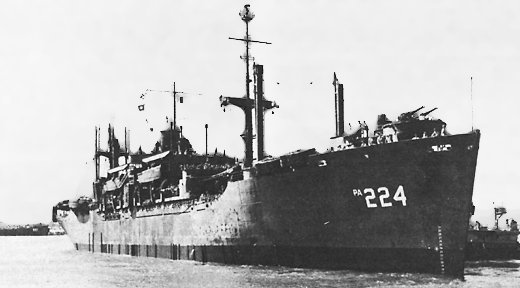
- USS Randall (APA-224), circa in 1945

History

United States
- Name: Randall
- Namesake: Randall County, Texas
- Ordered: as a Type VC2-S-AP5 hull, MCE hull 572
- Builder: Permanente Metals Corporation, Richmond, California
- Yard number: 572
- Laid down: 15 September 1944
- Launched: 15 November 1944
- Sponsored by: Mrs. Donald D. Dick
- Commissioned: 12 December 1944
- Decommissioned: 6 April 1956
- Stricken: 1 July 1960
- Identification: Hull symbol: APA-224; Code letters: NPRK
- Fate: laid up in the Atlantic Reserve Fleet, Orange, Texas, Group, 6 April 1956; reassigned to the National Defense Reserve Fleet, Mobile, Alabama, 19 February 1960; sold, 28 October 1971, withdrawn, 12 January 1972

General characteristics
- Class & type: Haskell-class attack transport
- Type: Type VC2-S-AP5
- Displacement: 6,873 long tons (6,983 t) (light load); 14,837 long tons (15,075 t) (full load)
- Length: 455 ft (139 m)
- Beam: 62 ft (19 m)
- Draft: 24 ft (7.3 m)
- Installed power: 2 × Babcock & Wilcox header-type boilers, 465 psi (3,210 kPa) 750 °F (399 °C); 8,500 shp (6,338 kW)
- Propulsion: 1 × Westinghouse geared turbine; 1 x propeller
- Speed: 17.7 kn (32.8 km/h; 20.4 mph)
- Boats & landing craft carried: 2 × LCMs; 1 × open LCPL; 18 × LCVPs; 2 × LCPRs; 1 × closed LCPL (Captain's Gig)
- Capacity: 2,900 long tons (2,900 t) DWT; 150,000 cu ft (4,200 m^{3}) (non-refrigerated)
- Troops: 87 officers, 1,475 enlisted
- Complement: 56 officers, 480 enlisted
- Armament: 1 × 5 in (127 mm)/38 caliber dual purpose gun; 1 × quad 40 mm (1.6 in) Bofors anti-aircraft (AA) gun mounts; 4 × twin 40mm Bofors (AA) gun mounts; 10 × single 20 mm (0.8 in) Oerlikon cannons AA mounts

Service record
- Part of: TransRon 23
- Awards: China Service Medal; American Campaign Medal; Asiatic–Pacific Campaign Medal; World War II Victory Medal; Navy Occupation Service Medal; National Defense Service Medal

USS Randall (APA-224) was a Haskell-class attack transport in service with the United States Navy from 1944 to 1956. She was sold for scrap in 1972.

== Construction ==
Randall was of the VC2-S-AP5 Victory ship design type and named after Randall County, Texas. She was laid down 15 September 1944, under a Maritime Commission (MARCOM) contract, MCV Hull 572, by Permanente Metals Corporation, Yard No. 2, Richmond, California; launched 15 November 1944; sponsored by Mrs. Donald D. Dick; and acquired by the Navy and commissioned 16 December 1944.

== Service history ==
Following shakedown and training off the California coast, Randall left for Pearl Harbor on 9 February 1945, from San Diego. She then sailed to the Volcano Islands, via Eniwetok. She arrived at Iwo Jima on 25 March, unloaded US Army personnel and supplies, and embarked Marines for transportation to Guam. The ship returned to Pearl Harbor 20 April, where she loaded drummed petroleum products for Kwajalein and took on Navy and Marine personnel for return to the US. Arriving in San Francisco on 18 June, she proceeded to Ulithi 9 July, embarking Army units, and then continued to Okinawa, arriving 12 August.

Comedian Soupy Sales served on Randall during the war and entertained his shipmates with zany vignettes featuring White Fang, the meanest dog that ever lived.

== Post-war – Operation Magic Carpet ==
With the end of World War II, Randall was assigned to occupation duty and on 5 September, got underway for Korea with units of the 7th Army Division. Returning to Okinawa, she carried Marines to Taku, 26–30 September, then, after a run to the Philippines, sailed again for the China coast. Between 22 October and 23 November, she ferried Chinese troops from Kowloon to Chinwangtao and Qingdao and on 29 November, departed the Far East on her first "Magic Carpet" run carrying US Army Air Corps units from Okinawa to Seattle.

Detached from "Magic Carpet" duty in August 1946, Randall was employed in the US Pacific Fleet's amphibious training program from September until December, when she returned to the east coast, underwent overhaul, and was briefly immobilized at New York. She then steamed to Norfolk, Virginia, arriving 24 April 1947. Assigned again to amphibious training duties, she operated along the southeastern seaboard until August 1948, when she steamed north for operations off eastern Canada. In September she resumed exercises off the Virginia and Carolina coasts.

In February 1949, she again departed the eastern seaboard this time for Caribbean operations, and during the fall steamed back into the Pacific for exercises as far west as Hawaii, returning to Norfolk and resuming training operations with Naval Reservists and Marines, 1 December.

From 1952, until her decommissioning, the ship sailed from Hampton Roads and Naval Amphibious Base Little Creek often berthing at NOB Pier 2. Between 1952 and 1955, she made numerous trips to the Caribbean for training purposes and a six-month training cruise to the Mediterranean. She had a total of three Captains – Nicholas Frank, Henry Sturr and Christopher Brackstone, all Naval Academy graduates. In 1954, she received the "E" award for her class. In 1955, Randall was used in the filming of Away All Boats as the fictitious USS Belinda, with filming primarily around Saint Thomas, U.S. Virgin Islands, and Vieques Island, Puerto Rico.

== Decommissioning ==
At the end of 1955, Randall was ordered inactivated and on 25 January 1956, she arrived at Orange, Texas, to join the Atlantic Reserve Fleet. Decommissioned 6 April 1956, she remained in reserve at Orange until transferred to the Maritime Administration's (MARAD) National Defense Reserve Fleet, Mobile Group, in February 1960. Her name was struck from the Navy list 1 July 1960.

== Fate ==
On 28 October 1971, Randall was sold to Union Minerals & Alloys Corporation, along with eight other ships, for $467,100, with the condition that they would be scrapped. On 17 January 1972, she was officially withdrawn from the Reserve Fleet.

== Notes ==
Citations

== Bibliography ==
Online resources

- "Randall (APA-224)". Dictionary of American Naval Fighting Ships. Naval History and Heritage Command. 19 January 2016. This article incorporates text from this source, which is in the public domain.
- "Kaiser Permanente No. 2, Richmond CA". ShipbuildingHistory.com. 13 October 2010.
- "USS Randall (APA-224)". NavSource. 28 March 2014.
- "Randall (APA-224)". United States Department of Transportation. Archived from the original on 4 December 2015.
- Hinckley, David (23 October 2009). "Friend remembers Soupy Sales as someone who'd 'do anything for you'". New York Daily News. Archived from the original on 25 October 2009.
