= Away All Boats =

1956 film by Joseph Pevney

- Original film poster by Reynold Brown
- Directed by: Joseph Pevney
- Written by: Ted Sherdeman
- Based on: novel by Kenneth Dodson
- Produced by: Howard Christie
- Starring: Jeff Chandler; George Nader; Lex Barker; Julie Adams
- Cinematography: William H. Daniels in Technicolor and VistaVision
- Edited by: Ted J. Kent
- Music by: Frank Skinner; Heinz Roemheld
- Production company: Universal Pictures
- Distributed by: Universal Pictures
- Release date: August 16, 1956 (United States)
- Running time: 114 minutes
- Country: United States
- Language: English
- Budget: $2 million
- Box office: $3.5 million (US)

Away All Boats is a 1956 American war film directed by Joseph Pevney and starring Jeff Chandler, George Nader, Lex Barker, and Julie Adams. It was produced by Howard Christie from a screenplay by Ted Sherdeman based on the 1953 novel by Kenneth Dodson (1907–1999), who served on the USS Pierce (APA-50) in World War II and used his experiences there as a guide for his novel. He was encouraged in his writing by Carl Sandburg, who had read some of Dodson's letters, written in the Pacific. The book (and film) is about the crew of the Belinda (APA-22), an amphibious attack transport. The book became a best seller. The film was produced by Universal Pictures.

== Plot ==
The story of USS Belinda (APA-22), launched late 1943 with regular-Navy Captain Jebediah S. Hawks and ex-merchant mariner Lieutenant Dave MacDougall as boat commander. Despite personal friction, the two have plenty to keep them busy as the only experienced officers on board during the ship's shakedown cruise. Their incompetence gradually improves, but the crew remains far from perfect when landing troops on enemy beachheads. Few anticipate the challenges in store at Okinawa.

== Cast ==
- Jeff Chandler as Capt. Jebediah S. Hawks
- George Nader as Lieut. Dave MacDougall
- Lex Barker as Commander Quigley
- Julie Adams as Nadine MacDougall
- Keith Andes as Doctor Bell
- William Reynolds as Ensign Kruger
- Richard Boone as Lieut. Fraser
- Charles McGraw as Lieut. Mike O'Bannion
- Kendall Clark as Lieut. Jackson
- Jock Mahoney as Alvick
- Hal Baylor as Chaplain Hughes
- John McIntire as Old Man / Film's narrator
- Frank Faylen as Chief Phillip P. 'Pappy' Moran
- James Westerfield as 'Boats' Torgeson
- Don Keefer as Ensign Twitchell

Uncredited

- Clint Eastwood as Corpsman
- David Janssen as Talker

== Production ==
Film rights were bought by Universal, whose president Edward Muhl said the movie version would be Universal's most expensive of the year.

The first choice for the lead role was Clark Gable.

George Nader had twice taken roles that Chandler refused. This was the first time the two actors worked together.

The armed services had not been pleased with their portrayal in From Here to Eternity or The Caine Mutiny. However the Navy was worried about declining recruitment numbers and Universal received its full cooperation for the film, including an opportunity to photograph maneuvers and mock attacks in March 1955 in the Caribbean and on Vieques. The movie was filmed aboard USS Randall. It is most notable for its realistic and terrifying depictions of Japanese kamikaze attacks on U.S. Navy ships during the last year of World War II in the Pacific Theater. The kamikaze attack scene was later reused in the 1976 film Midway (even though no such attacks occurred in that battle).

The Navy also granted a two-week leave of absence for Ralph Scalzo, a landing boat coxswain, who took part in filming in the Caribbean and was needed for added closeup shots in Hollywood.

Away All Boats is one of the few films made in VistaVision at a studio other than Paramount. The film made use of the Perspecta stereo process for its soundtrack.

Clint Eastwood's role is a brief speaking one (with one line of dialog spoken by another actor), as a Navy medical corpsman assisting the ship's captain after he is severely wounded while trying to save his ship.

The script, script revisions, and status reports dealing with the Department of Defense Film and Television liaison office are kept in the Georgetown University Library Department of Defense Film Collection.

== Reception ==
A review in The New York Times by Bosley Crowther found the early scenes in the film confusing, particularly the motivation of the characters played by Jeff Chandler (Captain Jebediah Hawks) and Lex Barker (Commander Quigley). He also found it an efficient service film in which “all the confusions are adjusted and everybody comes out a hero in the end”.

== Home media ==
NBC made a color documentary about the making of the film.

A record with some of Frank Skinner's music from the film was released by Decca Records in May 1956. Participants included Al Hibbler (who sang a theme from the film score) and an orchestra conducted by Jack Pleis. Decca released this on 78 rpm 29950 and 45 rpm 9–29950.

MCA Home Video released a VHS version in HiFi sound in 1986. Good Times Video released a VHS version in LP on March 2, 1998.

Good Times Video released a DVD on May 1, 2001. This was in full-screen rather than the VistaVision widescreen and may have been a copy of the earlier Good Times VHS release.

== See also ==
- List of American films of 1956
