= Homecoming (1948 film) =

1948 film

- Theatrical release poster
- Directed by: Mervyn LeRoy
- Written by: Sidney Kingsley
- Screenplay by: Jan Lustig; Paul Osborn
- Based on: The Homecoming of Ulysses
- Produced by: Sidney Franklin; Gottfriend Reinhardt
- Starring: Clark Gable; Lana Turner; Anne Baxter; John Hodiak
- Cinematography: Harold Rosson
- Edited by: John Dunning
- Music by: Bronislau Kaper
- Distributed by: Metro-Goldwyn-Mayer
- Release date: April 29, 1948
- Running time: 113 mins
- Country: United States
- Language: English
- Budget: $2.6 million
- Box office: $5.5 million

Homecoming is a 1948 American romantic drama film starring Clark Gable and Lana Turner. It was the third of their four films together, and like two of the others, was about a couple caught up in World War II.

== Plot ==
Ulysses Johnson (Clark Gable) is an American surgeon coming back from World War II. As he is sitting on the transport boat taking him back to America, he is asked by a reporter about his experiences during the war. Johnson begins to tell his story, beginning in 1941. Johnson is the chief surgeon at a hospital, a man free of emotional attachment to his patients. He joins the Army and has a cocktail party with his wife, Penny (Anne Baxter). During the party, a colleague of his, Dr. Robert Sunday (John Hodiak), accuses Johnson of being unsentimental, a hypocrite, and joining the Army out of purely selfish motives. Penny breaks up the fray and she and Johnson spend their last night together sipping cocktails.

Johnson then boards a transport ship, where he meets nurse Lt. Jane "Snapshot" McCall (Lana Turner). Although they initially do not get along, they eventually find they have a lot in common and become fast friends. Their friendship is at numerous moments tested as they begin to fall in love with one another. After taking a trip to bathe, Johnson and Snapshot come back to the base to find that a friend of Johnson's, Sergeant Monkevickz (Cameron Mitchell), is dying from a malaria-ruptured spleen. Johnson remembers that during his argument with Dr. Sunday, Sunday mentioned that people in Chester Village, where Monkevickz was from, were dying from malaria and being neglected by physicians. Johnson tells Snapshot that he treated Monkevickz without enough care as to treat him like a human being. To atone, Johnson asks Penny to visit Monkevickz's father. When Penny arrives at the house, she finds Doctor Sunday there and confesses that she is jealous of Snapshot, whom Johnson has mentioned in letters, and believes that Johnson and Snapshot are having an affair.

Meanwhile, Johnson and Snapshot have grown closer and when she is reassigned to a different outfit, she and Johnson kiss. They depart, but again encounter one another in Paris. They fall back in love, but leave to rescue the 299th division, which has fallen victim to enemy fire in the Battle of the Bulge. The story turns back to Johnson returning to his home following the war as a far more world-weary man. He returns to Penny, a ghost of his former self. He apologizes to Dr. Sunday for not heeding his warnings about the malaria in Chester Village and confesses to Penny his love for Snapshot, but tells Penny that Snapshot died of a shell fragment wound. The film ends leaving the viewer to assume that Johnson and Penny patch up their differences and live happier lives.

== Cast ==
- Clark Gable as Col. Ulysses Delby "Lee" Johnson
- Lana Turner as Lt. Jane "Snapshot" McCall
- Anne Baxter as Penny Johnson
- John Hodiak as Dr. Robert Sunday
- Ray Collins as Lt. Col. Avery Silver
- Gladys Cooper as Mrs. Kirby
- Cameron Mitchell as Sgt. Monkevickz
- Marshall Thompson as Sgt. McKeen
- Lurene Tuttle as Miss Stoker
- Edwin Cooper as Head Surgeon

== Background ==
Homecoming was devised by writer Sidney Kingsley as a story in 1944 called The Homecoming of Ulysses. It was the third film MGM assigned to Gable following his return from the service himself. His performance is unusually poignant, far different from his assignments from MGM in the thirties. Meanwhile, Lana Turner was assigned the particularly unglamorous role of Jane "Snapshot" McCall, and while the glamor girl was underrated, she gave a surprisingly earthy performance, coming across as warm and genuine, far different from other roles she had played earlier in the forties. This film also provided the third Gable/Turner pairing, which had proved remarkably successful in their first film together, Honky Tonk. The other movie in which they had starred together was Somewhere I'll Find You (1942). They would follow Homecoming with Betrayed (1954), which resulted in Gable and Turner's last pairing together, and Gable's last performance at MGM. Also, in Homecoming, Anne Baxter starred alongside husband John Hodiak, as he played the man who offered her character a shoulder to cry on.

== Reception ==
The film was one of MGM's biggest hits of the year and was number one at the US box office for four straight weeks. It earned theatrical rentals of $3,699,000 in the US and Canada and $1,895,000 elsewhere resulting in a profit of $1,047,000.
