= List of 1946 box office number-one films in the United States =

This is a list of films which placed number one at the weekly box office in the United States during 1946.

== Number-one films ==
Denotes the highest-grossing film of the year.

Week ending	Title	Notes	Ref
January 2	The Bells of St. Mary's		
January 9	TBD	No survey published.	
January 16	The Bells of St. Mary's		
January 23	TBD	No survey published.	
January 30	TBD	No survey published.	
February 6	TBD	No survey published.	
February 13	TBD	No survey published.	
February 20	TBD	No survey published.	
February 27	TBD	No survey published.	
March 6	TBD	No survey published.	
March 13	TBD	No survey published.	
March 20	TBD	No survey published.	
March 27	TBD	No survey published.	
April 3	TBD	Report did not note a number one nationally but said main focus was on Saratoga Trunk, Adventure, Road to Utopia and The Lost Weekend	
April 10	TBD	Survey did not note a number one nationally.	
April 17	Saratoga Trunk		
April 24	Dragonwyck		
May 1	Ziegfeld Follies		
May 8	Ziegfeld Follies		
May 15	Kitty		
May 22	The Blue Dahlia		
May 29	Do You Love Me		
June 5	The Postman Always Rings Twice	The Postman Always Rings Twice grossed $375,000 in the key cities covered.	
June 12	Two Sisters from Boston		
June 19	Two Sisters from Boston		
June 26	Two Sisters from Boston		
July 3	Smoky	Smoky grossed almost $250,000 in the key cities reported.	
July 10	A Stolen Life		
July 17	TBD	No survey published.	
July 24	TBD	No survey published.	
July 31	TBD	No survey published.	
August 7	Night and Day/Anna and the King of Siam		
August 14	Night and Day	Night and Day grossed almost $500,000 in the key cities covered.	
August 21	Night and Day	Night and Day grossed almost $418,000 in 22 key cities.	
August 28	Notorious		
September 4	Notorious		
September 11	Notorious/ Monsieur Beaucaire		
September 18	Notorious		
September 25	Notorious		
October 2	Notorious		
October 9	Notorious	Notorious grossed $245,000 from the key cities covered.	
October 16	Three Little Girls in Blue		
October 23	No Leave, No Love		
October 30	No Leave, No Love		
November 6	Two Years Before the Mast		
November 13	Two Years Before the Mast		
November 20	Margie		
November 27	Deception		
December 4	Undercurrent		
December 11	Undercurrent		
December 18	The Strange Woman		
December 25	Till the Clouds Roll By		

== Chronology ==
Preceded by 1945	1946	Succeeded by 1947
