= Home of the Brave (play) =

1945 play by Arthur Laurents

- Original language: English
- Written by: Arthur Laurents
- Characters: Capt. Harold Bitterger; Major Dennis Robinson, Jr. T.J. Coney; Finch; Mingo
- Genre: Drama
- Setting: Hospital room & office in The Pacific Base

Premiere
- Date: December 27, 1945
- Place: Belasco Theatre, New York City

Home of the Brave is a 1945 play by Arthur Laurents. A film adaptation was made in 1949, directed by Mark Robson. The Broadway production was directed by Michael Gordon. The play opened at the Belasco Theater on December 27, 1945, and closed on February 23, 1946.

== Cast and characters ==
The play opened at the Belasco Theater on December 27, 1945, and closed on February 23, 1946. The show was directed by Michael Gordon, and set and lighting design Ralph Alswang. The cast included Eduard Franz (Capt. Harold Bitterger), Kendall Clark (Major Dennis Robinson, Jr), Russell Hardie (T.J.), Joseph Pevney (Coney), Henry Barnard (Finch), and Alan Baxter (Mingo).

Its first New York revival was Off-Broadway at Playhouse 91 in December 1999, directed by Richard Sabellico, set design Richard Ellis, costume design Gail Boldoni, lighting design Richard Latta, sound design Bender Dubiel, with Laurents as creative consultant. The show starred Jeff Talbott (Capt. Harold Bitterger), Mark Deklin (Major Dennis Robinson, Jr), C. J. Wilson (T.J.), Robert Sella (Coney), Stephen Kunken (Finch), and Dylan Chalfy (Mingo).
