= Sidney Kingsley =

American dramatist (1906–1995)

- Born: Sidney Kirschner; October 22, 1906; New York City, U.S.
- Died: March 20, 1995 (aged 88); Oakland, New Jersey, U.S.
- Education: Cornell University (BA)
- Occupation: Playwright
- Years active: 1933–1977
- Spouse: Madge Evans (m. 1939; died 1981)
- Awards: 1934 Pulitzer Prize Best Drama

Sidney Kingsley (October 22, 1906 – March 20, 1995) was an American dramatist. He received the Pulitzer Prize for Drama for his play Men in White in 1934.

== Life and career ==
Kingsley was born Sidney Kirschner on the lower east side in New York City to a Jewish family. He studied at Cornell University, where he began his career writing plays for the college dramatic club. He joined the Group Theater for the production of his first major work. In 1933 the company performed his play Men in White. Set in a hospital, the play dealt with the issue of illegal abortion, 1930s medical and surgical practices, and the struggle of a promising physician who must choose to dedicate his life to medicine or devote himself to his fiancée. The play was a box-office smash.

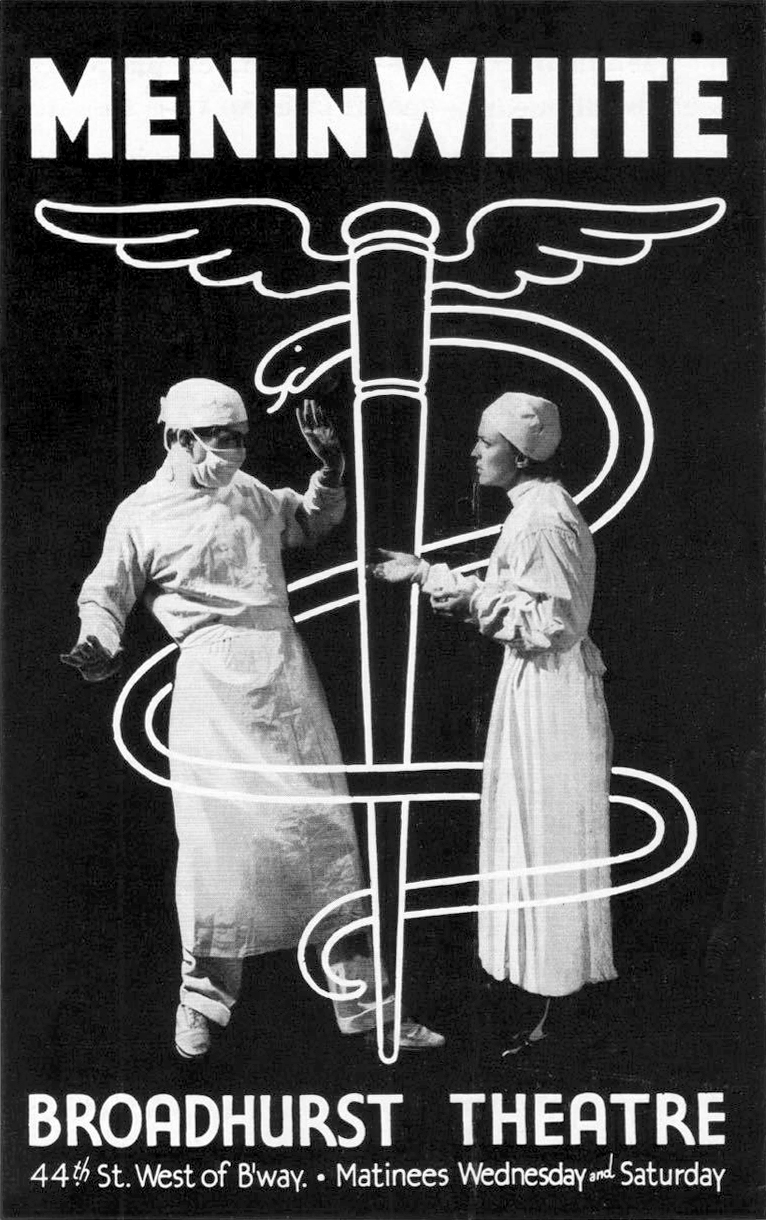
Handbill for the original Broadway production of Men in White

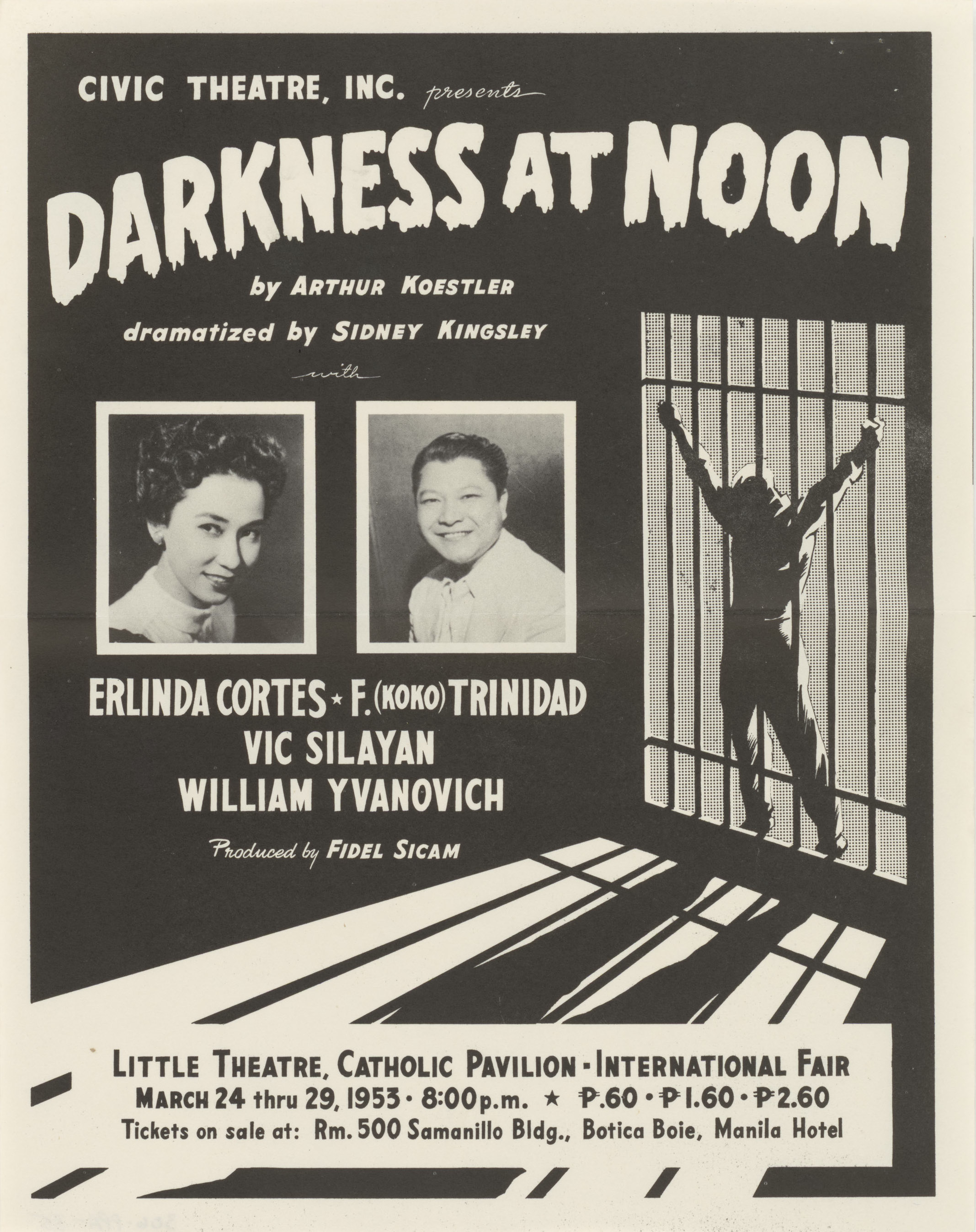
Handbill for Darkness at Noon, 1953

Kingsley followed this success with the play Dead End in 1935, a story about slum housing and its connection to crime. The play was fairly successful, being filmed and eventually spawning the film troupe The Dead End Kids. Kingsley's two successes were followed by his 1936 anti-war play Ten Million Ghosts and his 1939 work The World We Make, which were both flops and had short runs.

In 1943, Kingsley had success with the historical drama The Patriots, which told the story of Thomas Jefferson and his activities in the young American republic and won the New York Drama Critics Circle Award for Best Play. Kingsley continued writing for the theater late into his career, adapting Arthur Koestler's novel Darkness at Noon for the stage in 1951, and writing Lunatics and Lovers in 1954 and Night Life in 1962.

In addition to his work for the stage, Kingsley wrote a number of scripts for Hollywood productions, mostly based on his own work. He later also wrote the scripts and templates for numerous television series and television films.

Despite reaching the rank of lieutenant in the United States Army during World War II, soon after, in 1951, Kingsley's name was placed on the Hollywood Blacklist by the House Unamerican Activities Committee (HUAC), which ended his film career.

His marriage to actress Madge Evans in 1939 lasted until her death in 1981. The couple lived together in their 18th century Oakland, New Jersey, home for 42 years.

Meeting him in 1957, Michael Korda described Kingsley as "a short, powerfully built man with broad shoulders, a big head, and rough-hewn features that made him look like a bust by Sir Jacob Epstein". Kingsley hired Korda as an assistant to do research for a screenplay he was writing for CBS on the Hungarian Revolution which was never produced.

In 1964, Kingsley was elected president of the Dramatists Guild of America and in 1983, he was inducted into the American Theater Hall of Fame.

Kingsley died of a stroke on March 20, 1995, aged 88, in his home in Oakland, New Jersey.

== Works ==
- 1933: Men in White
- 1935: Dead End
- 1936: Ten Million Ghosts
- 1939: The World We Make
- 1943: The Patriots
- 1949: Detective Story
- 1951: Darkness at Noon (stage & TV adaptation)
- 1954: Lunatics and Lovers
- 1962: Night Life

=== Editions of Works ===
- Sidney Kingsley: Five Prizewinning Plays. Ohio State University Press, Columbus OH 1995. ISBN 0814206654 (Digitized full access on the publisher's page)

== Filmography ==
Year	Title	Writer	Crew	Production company	Credit
1934	Men in White	Yes	No	Metro-Goldwyn-Mayer	from the play by
1937	Dead End	Yes	No	Samuel Goldwyn Productions	based upon the play by
1948	Homecoming	Yes	No	Metro-Goldwyn-Mayer	story
1951	Detective Story	Yes	No	Paramount Pictures	based on the play by
1955	Producers' Showcase	Yes	No	NBC	1 episode: “Darkness at Noon” - play
1957	World in White	Yes	No	CBS	CBS Pilot
1957^	Hungarian Revolution film	Yes	No	CBS	researched and possibly written script but never produced
1960	DuPont Show of the Month	Yes	No	CBS	1 episode: Men in White - novel
1963	ITV Play of the Week	Yes	No	ITV (England)	1 episode: Darkness at Noon - play
1963	Detective Story - Polizeirevier 21	Yes	No	SDR (West Germany)	play
1963	Sonnenfinsternis	Yes	No	HR (West Germany)	adaptation of Darkness at Noon
1963	The Patriots	Yes	No	NBC	NBC TV Movie - play
1964	Primera fila	Yes	No	TVE (Spain)	1 episode: El cero y el infinito - play
1968	Polizeirevier 21	Yes	No	ZDF (West Germany)	Second West German adaptation - play “Detective Story”
1972	Au théâtre ce soir	Yes	No	ORTF (France)	1 episode: Histoire d'un détective - play
1973	Serpico	No	Yes	Paramount Pictures	Provided his Manhattan apartment as a filming location (uncredited)
1974	Alta Comedia	Yes	No	Canal 9 (Argentina)	1 episode: Uniforme blanco
1976	Great Performances	Yes	No	PBS	1 episode: The Patriots - play/teleplay
1971, 1978	Estudio 1	Yes	No	TVE (Spain)	2 episodes: Historia de detectives (1978), Historias de detectives (1971)
1978	Teatro estudio	Yes	No	TVE (Spain)	1 episode: Historia de detectives

^film never produced

== Awards ==
- 1934 Pulitzer Prize for Best Drama for Men in White.
