= Mr. Winkle Goes to War =

1944 film by Alfred E. Green

- Theatrical release poster
- Directed by: Alfred E. Green
- Written by: George Corey; Waldo Salt; Louis Solomon
- Based on: Mr. Winkle Goes to War; 1943 novel by Theodore Pratt
- Produced by: Jack Moss
- Starring: Edward G. Robinson; Ruth Warrick
- Cinematography: Joseph Walker
- Edited by: Richard Fantl
- Music by: Carmen Dragon; Paul Sawtell
- Distributed by: Columbia Pictures
- Release date: July 19, 1944
- Running time: 80 minutes
- Country: United States
- Language: English

Mr. Winkle Goes to War is a 1944 war comedy film starring Edward G. Robinson and Ruth Warrick, based on the 1943 novel by Theodore Pratt.

== Plot ==
On June 1, 1942, after fourteen years working in a bank, mild-mannered 44-year-old Wilbert G. Winkle suddenly quits his boring bank job to follow his dream, to open a repair shop. Everyone is shocked, particularly his status-conscious wife Amy, who demands he choose between her and his new career. The only exception is Barry, a young orphan Mr. Winkle has befriended.

However, before the situation with Amy can be resolved, Winkle is drafted into the army. His fellow soldiers inevitably nickname him "Rip".

He becomes friends with another older recruit, Joe Tinker, who is looking to avenge his younger brother. Winkle is reassigned to help the supply sergeant keep the books, as he did in civilian life, but he rebels and, with persistence and quiet determination, becomes a mechanic, something that gives him great satisfaction. To the surprise of his drill instructor, Sergeant Czeidrowski, he survives basic training. A new regulation allows men over 38 to get an honorable discharge, but Winkle refuses to quit.

When Winkle's furlough at the end of training is cancelled, Barry runs away to try to see him. Amy and the head of the orphanage, Mr. McDavid, find him hitchhiking and bring him back. On the way, Amy learns from Barry that there is more to her husband than she thought, causing her to reconsider.

Winkle and his unit are shipped out to fight the Japanese Army in the Pacific. When he and Tinker are sent to repair a bulldozer, the Japanese attack his unit. While Winkle fixes the bulldozer, Tinker takes his rifle to join the fighting. After shooting one enemy soldier and strangling another after hand-to-hand combat, he is killed himself. Winkle uses the bulldozer to knock out a machine-gun nest.

He is discharged and sent home to recuperate from his wounds. The war hero returns to an enthusiastic welcome from his entire hometown and in particular from Amy and Barry, who show him a new shortcut they have made together to his repair shop.

== Cast ==
- Edward G. Robinson as Wilbert G. Winkle
- Ruth Warrick as Amy Winkle
- Ted Donaldson as Barry
- Robert Armstrong as Joe Tinker
- Richard Lane as Sergeant "Alphabet" Czeidrowski
- Bob Haymes as Jack Pettigrew, another, younger bank employee also drafted
- Richard Gaines as Ralph Westcott, Winkle's brother-in-law
- Art Smith as Mr. McDavid

Robert Mitchum and Hugh Beaumont have uncredited roles.

== Reception ==
New York Times critic Bosley Crowther described it as "sure-fire and timeless humor, a non-violent form of slapstick, and it fulfills the basic requirements of the entertainment film. It does, that is, if you can reckon Mr. Robinson as a meek and modest man — a wishful characterization which this writer finds most hard to take. ... it stuck unconvincingly in our craw."
