= Kenneth Dodson =

Angolan-born American novelist and writer

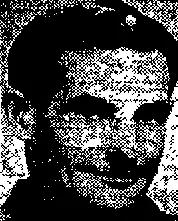
- Dodson in 1954
- Born: Kenneth MacKenzie Dodson; October 11, 1907; Luanda, Angola
- Died: May 24, 1999 (aged 91); Stanwood, Washington, U.S.
- Occupations: Novelist, writer

Kenneth MacKenzie Dodson (October 11, 1907 – May 24, 1999) was an Angolan-born American novelist and writer.

== Life and career ==
Dodson was born in Luanda, the son of American missionaries. He and his family moved to England, and then to the United States, where he was raised in Southern California. He worked for the United States Merchant Marine from 1925 to 1942. He enlisted in the United States Navy after the attack on Pearl Harbor, and he served from 1942 to 1946, retiring at the rank of lieutenant commander. During his military service, he fought in the Battle of Okinawa and in the Battle of Makin during World War II. After his discharge, he was urged by poet Carl Sandburg to write about his war experiences.

Dodson studied creative writing at the University of Washington, and in 1954, he wrote the novel Away All Boats. His novel was adapted as a film of the same name in 1956, directed by Joseph Pevney. In the same year, he wrote the novel Stranger to the Shore, and he wrote Hector the Stowaway Dog, which was adapted as a Disney children's television film in 1964. His final book was The Poet and the Sailor.

== Death ==
Dodson died from complications of congenital heart disease, Parkinson's disease and malaria in Stanwood, Washington on May 24, 1999, at the age of 91.
