= Theodore Pratt =

American writer

- Born: April 26, 1901; Minneapolis, Minnesota, U.S.
- Died: 15 December 1969 (aged 68); Delray Beach, Florida, U.S.
- Occupations: Novelist, short story writer

Theodore Pratt (April 26, 1901 – December 15, 1969) was an American writer of more than 30 novels, many set in Florida. Five films were adapted from them. He was from Minnesota. He lived and studied in New York, becoming a reporter. He also wrote columns. He returned from Europe and lived in Florida where he traveled and wrote.

== Early life in Minnesota ==
The son of Thomas Amede Pratt and Emma Rosetta Pratt (nee Hineline), Theodore George Pratt was born in Minneapolis, Minnesota on April 26, 1901. His father was Canadian by birth and moved to the United States in 1892 where he began working as a salesman for the Wyman-Partridge Holding Company. His mother was born in Minneapolis, and was the daughter of a German father and Irish mother. Theodore received a Roman Catholic baptism on May 1, 1901, and was raised in a devout household. His family frequently visited Lake Harriet during his childhood years, and he developed a love for reading while sitting along the shore. The first book that inspired a love for literature was Louisa May Alcott's Little Women.

Pratt's love for natural water settings was further established by annual family summer vacations to Lake Minnetonka where he learned how to canoe. His interest in Florida began when his uncle Eugene Pratt moved to Miami in 1912. By this time he was already heavily interested in writing, and had contributed pieces to his school newspaper.

== Move to New York and high school years ==
In 1915 the Pratt family moved to New York when his father accepted a job with a silk manufacturing company in New York City; initially settling in Brooklyn in the home of his aunt before taking up residence at the Endicott Hotel on 81st st and Columbus Ave in Manhattan. The nearby American Museum of Natural History and Central Park became places he visited on a weekly basis during his early time in New York, and natural history and nature became recurring subjects in his later writing career. He initially attended the sixth grade at Public School No. 87 in the New York City public school system, but mid year left when the Pratt family relocated to New Rochelle, New York sometime in either late 1915 or early 1916; settling into a home there at 96 Locust Avenue.

By Fall 1916 the Pratt family had moved to a new address in New Rochelle at 25 Sickles Place which was close to New Rochelle High School (NRHS) where Theodore attended school and wrote for the school newspaper, The Parrot. He became interested in becoming a journalist and obtained a job working for the New Rochelle Daily Star while a high school student. There he was trained in writing news pieces by the sister of the paper's editor, Amy Forbes King. His skills grew to such that when the paper's staff was largely incapacitated for a brief period during the Influenza epidemic of 1918, he single handedly took over getting the paper out for publication.

During the 1918-1919 school year, Pratt took over as editor of NRHS's school paper. Unhappy with the quality of the publication, he discontinued The Parrott, and relaunched a newly formed paper entitled The Purple and White which implemented the journalistic standards he had learned working for the New Rochelle Daily Star. At this same time he became a writer for the local magazine The Chesterfieldian for whom he wrote interview pieces with playwright Augustus Thomas and local artists like Norman Rockwell, J. C. Leyendecker, Coles Phillips, and Clare Briggs among other well known people. He also wrote many short stories during his high school years; some of which were published in The Purple and White.

== College education ==
Pratt took a class in short story writing at Columbia University in the summer of 1919 which he paid for with his own money. He graduated from NRHS on June 24, 1920, and then began studies at Colgate University in the 1920-1921 academic year. At Colgate he was a member of Phi Kappa Psi, and wrote for several university publications, including the college's paper, a literary magazine, a humor magazine, and the college yearbook. His grades at Colgate fluctuated from Bs and Cs to failing grades; with his attentions taken away from his classes by extra-curricular activities and the distractions of pursuing his own reading interests in the college's library.

After attending Colgate for two years, Pratt transferred to Columbia University where he studied for another two years, but did not graduate. He did well in play writing courses, but was deeply unhappy with some of the writing professors like Blanche Colton Williams whom he felt was too "limiting and didactic". Some of his other teachers at Columbia included John Erskine and Raymond Weaver. One of his plays written while he was at Columbia, The Revolt of the Mummies, was performed on Broadway at the Nora Bayes Theatre on May 7, 1923 as part of the Little Theatre League's play writing competition. Variety reviewed the production which was put on by the Huguenot Players of New Rochelle, calling it "a cleverly conceived exceedingly bright travesty".

== Career ==
After leaving Columbia, Pratt worked as a play reader and columnist for the New York Sun. He was also a staff reader for a movie company; scouting plays for potential development into film. He also free-lanced articles for The New Yorker and other national magazines. Theodore Pratt married Belle Jacqueline (Jackie) Jacques on October 26, 1929. The couple went to Europe for their honeymoon, and stayed for four years, during which he served as the European correspondent for the New York Sun.

The Pratts eventually settled in Mallorca, Spain, where Pratt wrote a column for the English language Daily Palma Post. In 1933 Pratt wrote an article for The American Mercury called "Paradise Enjoys a Boom" that was highly critical of the Mallorcan character and way of life (he called Mallorcans "among the cruelest people to animals extant in the civilized world", and said "they make inept servants, and when not shirking their work from pure laziness or contrariness, they are stealing food to take to their own home"). After parts of the article appeared in translation in Mallorca, the Pratts were forced to leave Spain and returned to the United States.

=== Florida ===
The Pratts moved to Lake Worth Beach, Florida in 1934. He adapted his novel The Big Blow (1936) into the play The Big Blow which ran on Broadway in the 1938-1939 season. In 1946, the Pratts moved for a brief period to California, but returned to Florida to live in Boca Raton.

Pratt traveled extensively in Florida, in particular away from the tourist areas on the east coast, to gather material for his writing. While he was writing Mercy Island, he lived in the Florida Keys so that he could more accurately portray the lives of the Conch people of the Keys. His Escape to Eden incorporated material from a trip into the Everglades he had made with members of the Audubon club on which their boat ran out of gas, leaving them stranded for a day-and-a-half.

In 1958, the Pratts moved to Delray Beach, Florida, where he died on December 15, 1969.

== Writing ==
Theodore Pratt published more than thirty novels, including four mysteries under the pseudonym of "Timothy Brace", two collections of short stories, two plays (adapted from his novels), a few non-fiction books and pamphlets, and numerous short stories and articles in periodicals such as Esquire, Blue Book, Escapade, The Gent, Manhunt, Guilty Detective Story Magazine, Coronet, Fantastic Universe, Space Science Fiction, and The Saturday Evening Post.

Some of his novels had strong sexual content by the standards of the time. The Tormented (1950), a study of nymphomania, was turned down by thirty-four publishers. It eventually sold more than a million copies.

== Legacy ==
The Theodore Pratt Collection of first editions and manuscript material can be found in the Special Collections section of the library at Florida Atlantic University in Boca Raton.

== Partial list of works ==
=== Novels ===
- Not Without the Wedding (1935)
- The Big Blow (1936)
- Mercy Island (1941); adapted into the film Mercy Island (1941)
- Mr. Limpet (1942); adapted into the film The Incredible Mr. Limpet (1964) starring Don Knotts
- Mr. Winkle Goes to War (1943); adapted into the film Mr. Winkle Goes to War (1944)
- The Barefoot Mailman (1943); first book in the Palm Beach trilogy; adapted into the film The Barefoot Mailman (1951)
- The Flame Tree: Florida in the Fabulous Days of the Royal Poinciana Hotel
- The Hohokam Dig
- The Tormented (1950)
- The Flame Tree (1950); second book in the Palm Beach trilogy
- The Big Bubble (1951); final book in the Palm Beach trilogy
- Handsome (1951)

=== Plays ===
- The Revolt of the Mummies (1923)
- The Big Blow (1938), adapted by Pratt after his 1936 novel
- Seminole (1954),

=== Short stories ===
- "Land of the Jook", published in The Saturday Evening Post on April 26, 1941; adapted into the film Juke Girl (1942)
