= Maxine Elliott's Theatre =

Former theatre in Manhattan, New York

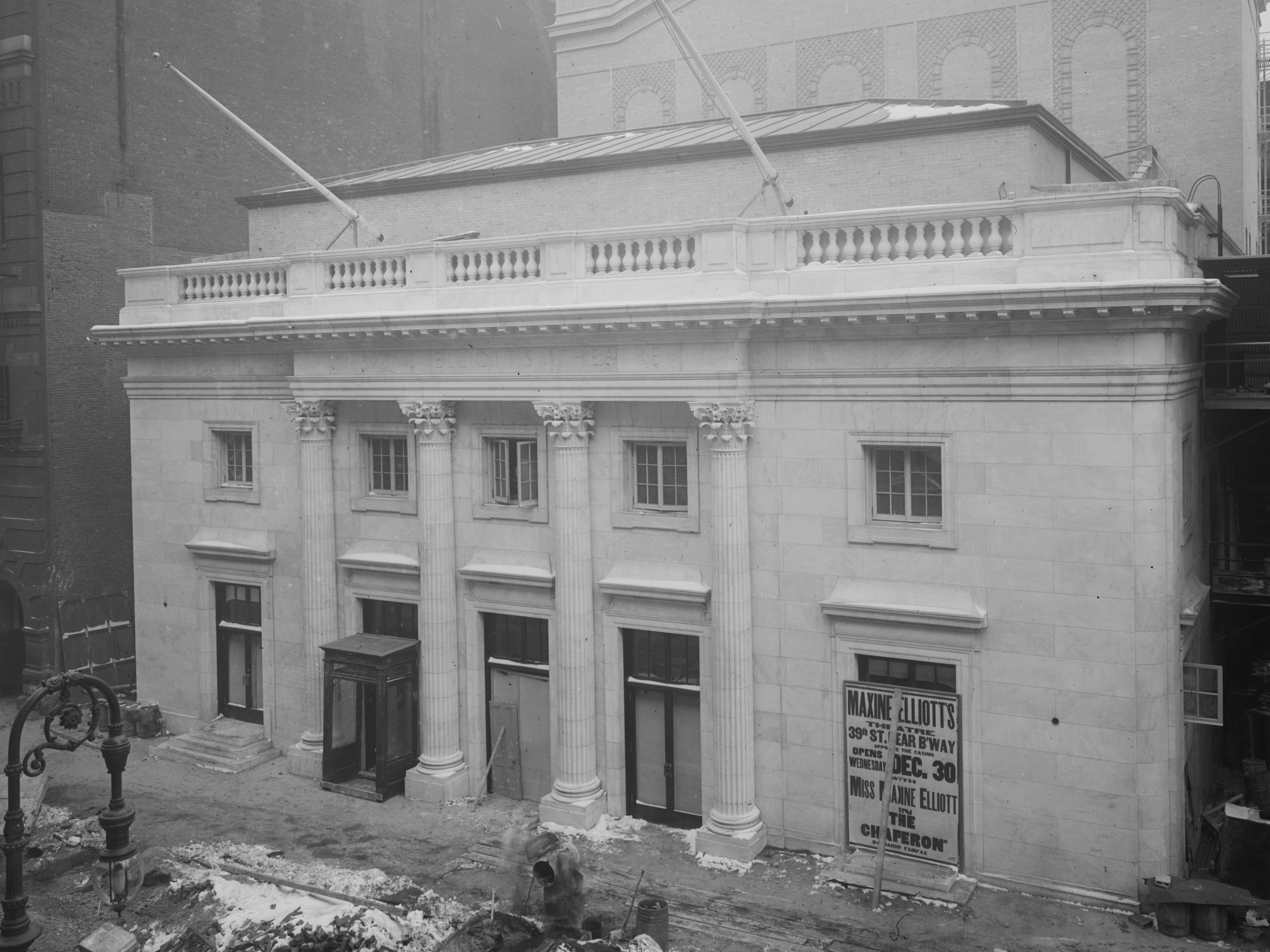
- Maxine Elliott's Theatre before its opening on December 30, 1908
- Interactive map of Maxine Elliott's Theatre
- Former names: WOR Mutual Radio Theatre (1941–1944), CBS Radio Playhouse No. 5 (1944–1948), CBS Television Studio No. 44/Studio 51 (1948–1956)
- Address: 109 West 39th Street; Manhattan, New York City; U.S.
- Coordinates: 40°45′12.06″N 73°59′9.46″W
- Owner: Maxine Elliott (1908–1940), The Shubert Organization (1908–1956), Maxine Elliott's heirs (1940–1956)
- Capacity: 935
- Type: Broadway theatre (1908–1941) recording studio (1941–1948) television studio (1948–1956)
- Events: Theatre (1908–1941) radio drama (1941–1948) variety show (1948–1953)

Construction
- Built: 1908
- Opened: December 30, 1908
- Renovated: 1948
- Closed: 1956
- Reopened: 1941, 1944, 1948 (following temporary closures)
- Demolished: 1960
- Architect: Marshall and Fox

Tenant
- Federal Theatre Project 1936–1937, Mutual Broadcasting System 1941–1944, CBS 1944–1956

Maxine Elliott's Theatre was originally a Broadway theatre at 109 West 39th Street in the Midtown Manhattan neighborhood of New York City. Built in 1908, it was designed by architect Benjamin Marshall of the Chicago-based firm Marshall and Fox, who modeled the façade after the neoclassical Petit Trianon in Versailles. In later years, it was known as WOR Mutual Radio Theatre (1941–1944), CBS Radio Playhouse No. 5 (1944–1948), and CBS Television Studio No. 44 or CBS Television Studio Studio 51 (1948–1956). The theater was demolished in 1960 to make way for the Springs Mills Building.

== History ==
The theatre was named for American actress Maxine Elliott, who originally owned a 50 percent interest in it, in partnership with The Shubert Organization. Elliott was one of the few women theater managers of her time. She leased it to the Federal Theatre in 1936; the following year, it was shut down by the government on the eve on the opening of Orson Welles's production of The Cradle Will Rock.

In 1941, the theatre became a radio studio and in 1948 was converted for television production, where the very first episodes of Ed Sullivan's Toast of the Town variety show originated (from 1948 until 1953). In 1956, Elliott's heirs sold her share to the Shuberts, who then sold the property. It was demolished in 1960 and the Springs Mills Building was built on the site, being completed in 1963. The theatre, built in a thriving theatre district, was the last remaining Broadway house below 41st Street.

Maxine Elliott's Theatre seated approximately 935 patrons. Throughout its lifetime, it housed a multitude of plays, including original works by George Bernard Shaw, John Millington Synge, Lady Augusta Gregory, Lord Dunsany, Lillian Hellman and Somerset Maugham. Only nine of its dozens of productions were musicals, including one opera, See America First, by Cole Porter.

== Notable productions ==
- 1908: The Chaperon starring Maxine Elliott (opening December 30, 1908)
- 1909: The Blue Mouse by Clyde Fitch
- 1911: Riders to the Sea; The Playboy of the Western World
- 1916: See America First; How He Lied to Her Husband
- 1925: Hay Fever; The Master Builder
- 1926: The Constant Wife
- 1934: The Children's Hour
- 1936: Horse Eats Hat
- 1937: Doctor Faustus
- 1938: The Big Blow
- 1947: Life of Galileo
- 1948: Skipper Next to God
