= The Desperate Hours =

The Desperate Hours may refer to:

- The Desperate Hour, a 2022 thriller film starring Naomi Watts
- The Desperate Hours (Hayes novel), a 1954 thriller novel by Joseph Hayes
- The Desperate Hours (play), a 1955 play by Joseph Hayes, based on the novel
- The Desperate Hours (1955 film), a film, based on the novel and play
- The Desperate Hours (1967 film), a television film, based on the novel
- Desperate Hours, a 1990 film, a remake of the 1955 film
- The Desperate Hours (Aiello novel), a 2005 crime novel by Robert Aiello
- The Desperate Hours (Porridge), an episode of the BBC sitcom Porridge
- "The Desperate Hours", an episode of the TV comedy series Steptoe and Son
- "Desperate Hours", a song by Died Pretty from the 1987 album Pre-Deity
