= Rusty Lane =

American actor (1899–1986)

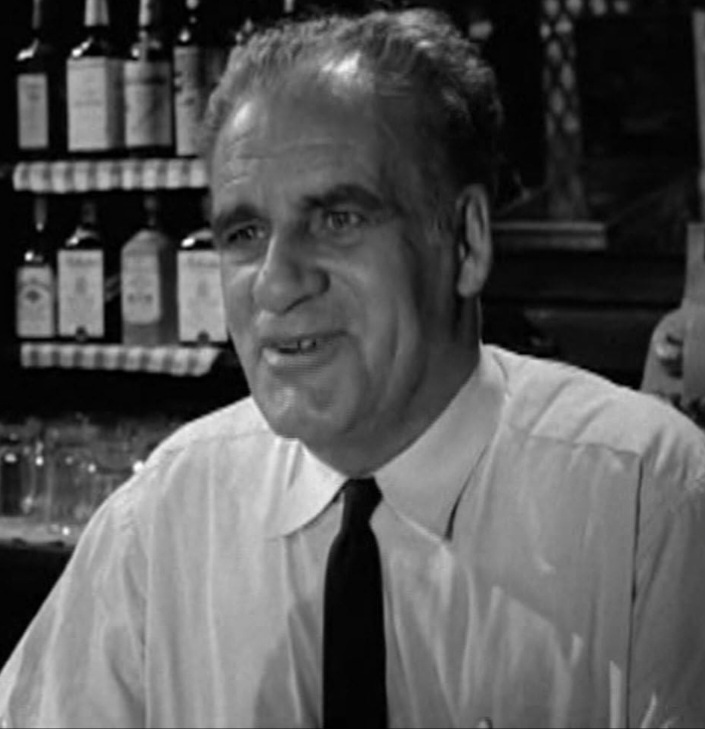
- Lane in an episode of One Step Beyond (1959)
- Born: James Russell Lane; May 31, 1899; Chicago, U.S.
- Died: October 10, 1986 (aged 87); Los Angeles, U.S.
- Other names: J. Russell Lane, Russell Lane
- Education: University of Illinois
- Occupations: Actor, college professor
- Years active: 1927–1942 (professor); 1943–1973 (actor)
- Spouses: Laura Koch (m. 1928; div. 1946); Sara M. Anderson (m. 1947)
- Children: 5, including Sara Lane

Rusty Lane (born James Russell Lane; May 31, 1899 – October 10, 1986), was a college professor and professional actor. He left academia in his forties to appear in several Broadway productions during the 1940s and 1950s, including three years as an original cast member for Mister Roberts. He was in the original cast for another Tony award-winning play, The Desperate Hours. Lane also performed in 21 films and made hundreds of televisions appearances from 1950 up through 1973, including as the star of the TV series Crime with Father, and as a regular cast member of the daytime serial The Clear Horizon.

== Early life ==
James Russell Lane was born in Chicago, Illinois, the younger of two children for Mack M. Lane, a school teacher and principal, and Cora Barr Lane. As a young man he used his middle name in preference to his first, coming to be known by his nickname "Rusty". Later, as a teacher and professor he used "J. Russell Lane" for formal situations.

By age 17, his family had moved to suburban Crete, Illinois, from where Lane enlisted in the U.S. Army on July 17, 1917. Sent for training with the Illinois National Guard at Champaign, Illinois, he was assigned to the US 124th Field Artillery Regiment. By October, his regiment had moved to Camp Logan in Houston, Texas. He received a medical discharge on December 24, 1917, due to a foot injury. He then worked as a teacher in Pisgah, Iowa.

== College ==
Lane was a student at the University of Illinois from 1922 thru 1926 when he graduated. He played football his first two years under coach Bob Zuppke, was a member of the 1923 championship team with Red Grange, but lost part of that season due to academic probation. His later college years were focused on theater and public speaking under the mentorship of Professor W. C. Troutman. He was elected president of the college dramatic society, took part in plays, and in his senior year represented Illinois at an interstate public speaking competition held in Madison, Wisconsin.

== Academic career ==
After graduation Lane took up a teaching position in Iowa City, Iowa. Lane taught public speaking at Iowa City High School, served as its dramatics director, and also took part in theater productions at the University of Iowa. After one year he left to take up a position at La Crosse State Teachers College (now the University of Wisconsin–La Crosse). He spent two years there, teaching public speaking and staging college plays, then was selected by his former college mentor, W. C. Troutman, who was then at the University of Wisconsin, to be business manager for the university theater in Madison.

Lane would spend nearly fourteen years at the University of Wisconsin, managing the university theater and teaching public speaking. During this time he brought many top stage stars to the university for performances, and helped develop some future stars (Don Ameche, Tom Ewell, Uta Hagen, Don Fellows, Cy Howard) as well. He also oversaw the opening of the new Wisconsin Union Theater, at which in April 1942, Knickerbocker Holiday, was staged as the one hundredth production of his college directing career. Lane resigned his position the same month. After several months doing radio and stage work in New York City, he took a position with the American Red Cross, producing entertainment for servicemen in England.

== East Coast career ==
=== Stage work ===
While in London, Lane persuaded playwright Maxwell Anderson to allow the US Army to stage his play The Eve of St. Mark as a non-profit production. Lane supervised the production, which was mounted in the Scala Theatre and featured American soldiers and Red Cross workers in the cast. Lane returned to New York to direct Anderson's new play Storm Operation. Rehearsals began in November; by December 13, 1943, the play had its first tryout in Baltimore, followed by a week in Pittsburgh. However, in between tryouts Lane was replaced as director. Lane then went into the cast of Decision by Edward Chodorov, which had its first tryout on January 21, 1944, at the Wilmington, Delaware Playhouse. It premiered at the Belasco Theatre on February 2, 1944, with Lane drawing mild praise for his supporting role from The New York Times. John Chapman of the New York Daily News was more generous, writing: "Rusty Lane, a drama professor and director, makes his acting debut in the role of a lawyer, and proves that self-taught or not, he is well taught".

Decision ran until June 17, 1944, after which Lane went into the cast of Lower North by Martin Bidwell. A weak war training comedy drama, it closed after just nine days. Lane was then cast in his first screen role, Now It Can Be Told, a movie being made in New York by Louis de Rochemont for 20th Century-Fox. The film was released as The House on 92nd Street in late 1945 to generally good reviews. In May 1945 Lane was hired by the USO to produce and direct stage plays that its various entertainment troupes could take to overseas bases. During the next year he would craft five productions of popular plays for USO companies.

Lane next performed in Bathsheba by Jacques Deval, which opened March 26, 1947 and starred James Mason in his Broadway debut. Lane portrayed Joab, for which he received mild commendation from the Daily News critic, who was a bit hard on the two leads, James Mason and Pamela Kellino. The Brooklyn Daily Eagle said Deval's characters "seem to have gotten into his play simply because some clothes had come from a costumer's and needed men and women to fill them". The play closed on April 19, 1947. Two years later Lane told Earl Wilson "Oooh, what a stinker that one was!"

The Experimental Theatre presented Bertolt Brecht's Galileo in a limited engagement of six performances from December 7 through December 14, 1947. The play was translated by Charles Laughton, who would also star as the Italian astronomer. Lane was part of a supporting cast that included Joan McCracken, Wesley Addy, and John Carradine, under the direction of Joseph Losey.

=== Mister Roberts ===
After doing a trio of unsuccessful plays, Lane was cast in a critical and popular hit, the 1948 Tony Award winner Mister Roberts. This had an opening tryout at the Shubert Theatre in New Haven, Connecticut on January 23, 1948, where the reviewer predicted immediate success on Broadway and mentioned Lane favorably. Another tryout was mounted at Philadelphia's Walnut Theatre, before the play premiered on Broadway at the Alvin Theatre on February 18, 1948.

Lane's character, Chief Johnson, was a supporting role, the first on stage each night. However, he also understudied the lead role of "Doc", played by Robert Keith. When Keith was in an auto accident during May 1948, Lane took over as Doc until Keith was able to return, while his own part was played by ensemble cast member Robert Keith Jr, later better known as Brian Keith. Besides Doc, Lane was also understudy for the role of the Captain.

Though his evenings were committed to Mister Roberts, Lane was able to utilize his days to do a number of radio broadcasts for the anthology series Grand Central Station. He also had time to perform in his second movie, Johnny One-Eye, for a segment filmed near Washington Square Park during late July 1949. And he also moonlighted during June 1950 for his first known television performance on Hands of Destiny.

After almost three years of playing Chief Johnson, Lane was promoted to the lead role of the Captain, taking over from William Harrigan, who left in November 1950 for an RKO movie contract. Lane's name then appeared in the newspaper ads for the play along with the other three principals. He would play that part on tour even after the original Broadway production closed at the Alvin Theatre during January 1951 and formed a second road company. (Note: There had been a road company of Mister Roberts for the previous eighteen months.) Lane's involvement with Mister Rogers finally came to end when the road company closed during May 1951. According to columnist Irvin Farman, Lane had played in "1,382 performances... He was the only member of the cast who played every Broadway and road tour performance, playing the chief 1,063 times, Doc 56 times, and the captain 263 times".

=== Crime with Father ===
With no stage commitments at hand, Lane moved into television acting during 1951. Besides doing anthology shows, he also starred in his own mystery series, Crime with Father. This program, debuting on ABC television on August 31, 1951, had him as police homicide detective Jim Riland, a widower whose daughter Chris Riland (Peggy Lobin) often aided and complicated his investigations. According to columnist Terry Vernon, the show was filmed on actual streets without using stock clips or background projections, and showed the home life of the Rilands. The New York Times review of the first episode said it was "...an obviously low-budgeted series, has a far better than average quality of production, even if the pistol shots still sound like cap pistols".

The series lasted for 21 episodes, its final original broadcast coming on January 18, 1952. Because it was a filmed series, it played longer in some markets. After it ended, Lane went right back to doing anthology series. He also did a recurring character called Porphory Pete on the family-orientated Captain Video and His Video Rangers. This was a live daily science-fiction program on the DuMont Television Network. Porphory Pete was a "raffish, interplanetary prospector" who was friends with Captain Video. A newspaper article by Robert Downing, who played a villain, establishes that Lane's participation in the daily show may have lasted for weeks, however, very few actual episodes can be identified today. Another television program for which Lane had at least a recurring, if not a regular role, was a short-lived NBC fantasy-adventure series, Operation Neptune.

=== Return to stage ===
Stockade was a grim play, "a sobering drama" according to Brooks Atkinson, taken from chapters of From Here to Eternity that were left out of the film version. Atkinson praised the "vivid characterizations" of Lane and other actors, but Louis Sheaffer felt the play was "drab" and "uninspired", while John Chapman called it "cheerless, sadistic and pointless". The play flopped quickly at the Off Broadway President Theatre during early 1954, and Lane went on with doing anthology series on television.

However, the number of television episodes he did declined during the second half of 1954. The New York-based DuMont Television Network was failing, and the bulk of new production work was moving towards Hollywood. Lane, still resident in New York City, now filled the gaps between TV spots with lower-paying regional theater work. Towards the end of December 1954 he was cast in what would be his final Broadway performance.

=== The Desperate Hours ===
The Desperate Hours was adapted by Joseph Hayes from his novel. The story concerns a suburban family of four whose quiet home is invaded by three escaped convicts. Staged by Robert Montgomery, it starred Karl Malden and Nancy Coleman as the parents, with Paul Newman as the convict leader. The play had its first tryout at the Shubert Theater in New Haven, Connecticut on January 6, 1955.

It then went to Locust Street Theatre in Philadelphia, on January 12, 1955, for a highly praised three-week run.

The play opened on February 10, 1955, at the Ethel Barrymore Theatre on Broadway. Lane's role in this play as a police lieutenant was smaller than his parts in Mister Roberts and Stockade, and reviewers mention him only in passing. Besides an excellent cast, taut writing and staging, the production had an extraordinary set design by Howard Bay.

After 212 performances, The Desperate Hours closed on Broadway on August 13, 1955, and a road company was sent out to the West Coast that included Lane and his wife Sara Anderson. By late October 1955, Lane was back in New York for filming of The Harder They Fall, but he returned to Los Angeles for Beyond a Reasonable Doubt in March 1956.

== West Coast career ==
=== Films and television ===
James Mason cast Lane for Bigger Than Life, which was filmed during May 1956 under the working title of One in a Million. Going forward, all of Lane's screen work would be produced in Los Angeles. (Note: His last New York originated TV programs were broadcast in January 1955; his next television work, appearing during summer 1956, would be Hollywood produced.) Lane made ten films during 1957–1958, but the quality of the pictures trailed off considerably in the latter year, and it would be 1963 before he made another. His television work expanded during that same period, with some guest star parts in narrative series. However, a great many of his small screen roles were character bits, often as a sheriff or judge or police detective.

=== The Clear Horizon ===
Lane was cast in a major role for the CBS daily daytime drama, The Clear Horizon, starting in July 1960. This show followed an Army officer, Roy Selby (Ed Kemmer) and his wife Anne (Phyllis Avery) after his transfer to an Army space program test site near Cape Canaveral, Florida. Third-billed Lane played Harry Moseby, a sergeant formerly under Selby's command and godfather to his young son. Moseby was on his second marriage, and his wife Frances (Eve McVeagh) was discovering she didn't care for Army life. The show's creator and head writer, Manya Star, a former WAVES officer, was adamant the program was not a soap opera: "The emphasis is on the men, and the women know how to cope with things, instead of wringing their hands". Among the show's secondary storylines was that of Corporal Davis (James Edwards), a Negro soldier who fights to get into Officer Candidate School, and the difficulty in finding housing for his wife after he does. Another storyline concerned a Jewish army officer (Michael Fox) who was married to a French Catholic woman (Gerry Gaylor).

The show was filmed, not broadcast live. Six episodes were made each week, to build up a reserve for vacations. During March 1961 CBS stopped broadcasting original episodes; however, stations behind the network feed used filmed copies to keep showing it into April. Columnist Allen Rich queried CBS VP for Daytime Programs Bruce Lansbury about the switch from soap operas like Clear Horizon and Full Circle to game shows. Lansbury claimed the network was trying to provide entertainment instead of displaying other people's problems, and that reader mail favored the changes. Less than a year later, a new CBS VP for Daytime Programs, Lawrence White, announced that The Clear Horizon would resume new episodes on February 26, 1962, (Note: The actual second debut was the following day, February 27, as it was pre-empted by a CBS news special on an event with John Glenn, who had returned from his orbital flight the week before.) citing popular demand for its return.

The second life of The Clear Horizon lasted only until June 15, 1962, when it was dropped from the CBS daytime schedule in favor of a traditional soap opera, The Brighter Day, which was expanded from 15 minutes to a half-hour. This was in spite of a letter-writing campaign to CBS by fans of The Clear Horizon.

=== Later life ===
Television continued to be Lane's main source of acting work during the 1960s. He made only five films during that decade, but performed in 64 television episodes, not counting The Clear Horizon. He had a small recurring role as a court clerk on the legal drama Sam Benedict, and another as police Sgt. Murchison on 87th Precinct. Lane's performing work wound down to just five television episodes during the early 1970s. His last known acting job was for an episode of Gunsmoke in 1973.

Lane lived for another thirteen years after retiring.

== Personal life ==
At age 43, Lane stood 5 ft 8 1/2 in (174 cm) tall, weighed 160 pounds (73 kg), and had gray eyes and brown hair.

While teaching at Iowa City High School in 1926, Lane met Laura Koch, who was also a teacher there. They were married on August 1, 1928, at her parents' home in St. Ansgar, Iowa. During their fifteen years of marriage they had two daughters, Laura Lee Lane and Carol Anne Lane, who were occasionally cast in University of Wisconsin stage productions. They were divorced in May 1946.

Columnist Whitney Bolton reported that whenever Lane found himself in a long-running stage production, he'd populate his theatre dressing room with small pets. During Mister Roberts it was cages of hamsters, while for The Desperate Hours he had a large aquarium stocked with Apistogramma from Venezuela.

Lane had often cast two sisters from Madison named Gloria and Sara Anderson while staging plays at the university during 1940–1941. Gloria stayed with the university, but Sara went on to New York where she found stage work on Broadway. Several years later Lane also went to New York, and eventually met up with Sara Anderson again when both were in Storm Operation. Despite a twenty-year age difference, they married on May 21, 1947. Their first child, Susan Russell Lane, later became an actress under the stage name Sara Lane, though she was called "Russell" by her family. They also had two other children together, Walter and Margarethe. After their move to California, they lived at a cabin in Topanga Canyon, near the south entrance close to the ocean.

== Stage performances ==
Listed by year of first performance, excluding student productions

Year	Play	Role	Venue	Notes/source
1943	The Eve of St. Mark	(Producer)	Scala Theatre	Though Lane's role was producer, he is often credited with directing this production.
1944	Decision	Bennett	Belasco Theatre; Ambassador Theatre	Lane was an honest lawyer for a group battling racism in war factory work.
1944	Lower North	Pratzell	Belasco Theatre	Lane played the CPO of a US Navy training unit in this flop.
1947	Bathsheba	Joab	Ethel Barrymore Theatre	
1947	Galileo	Barbarini	Maxine Elliott's Theatre	This was a limited engagement of six performances with the actors working at scale.
1948	Mister Roberts	Chief Johnson	Alvin Theatre	Tony award winner for Best Play of 1948. Lane also played Doc and the Captain during the original run.
1951	Mister Roberts	The Captain	Touring Company	
1953	Mister Roberts	Doc	Berkshire Playhouse	One week run for the end of the Berkshire Theatre Festival.
1954	Stockade	Jack Molloy	President Theatre	Lane was an incarcerated soldier in this grim short-lived Off Broadway production.
1954	My Aunt Daisy		Westport Country Playhouse	Original play by Albert Halper and Joseph Schrank, starred Jo Van Fleet.
1954	Mister Roberts	The Captain	Paper Mill Playhouse	Three week run; with Jeffrey Lynn, Daniel Keyes, Casey Walters, Sara Anderson.
1954	Sabrina Fair		Paper Mill Playhouse	Lane's wife Sara Anderson starred in this two-week run.
1955	The Desperate Hours	Lieutenant Carl Fredericks	Ethel Barrymore Theatre	Tony award winner for Best Play of 1955.
1955	The Desperate Hours	Lieutenant Carl Fredericks	Touring Company	

== Radio performances ==
Year	Program	Episode	Notes/source
1948	Grand Central Station	Deaf But Not Dumb	Mystery set in Adirondacks lodge; with Cathleen Cordell, Donald Buka, Gregory Morton, and Will Geer
1948	Grand Central Station	Late Growth	10th Anniversary show; Sarah Fussell, E. G. Marshall, Joe Sweeney, and Will Geer.
1948	Grand Central Station	Identical	Leon Janney and Lane are twin brothers, with Cathleen Cordell.
1949	Grand Central Station	No Time for Poetry	
1949	Grand Central Station	Go by Rail, Stay Out of Jail	With Staats Cotsworth, Doro Merande, Cathleen Cordell, Vaughn Taylor.
1950	Grand Central Station	A Promise to Cathy	Foreign correspondent is tempted to crime. With John Beal, Howard Smith, Polly Rowles.
1950	Grand Central Station	The Heel	With Staats Cotsworth, James Lanphier, Olga Fabien, Kathleen Comegys.
1950	Grand Central Station	Human Nature	Story of summer romance stars Judy Parrish and Les Tremayne, with Helen Claire, Gavin Gordon, Joseph Boland.
1950	Grand Central Station	Solitaire	With Don Hanmer, Mimi Strongin.
1951	Grand Central Station	Eyewitness	With Dean Harens and Patricia Wheel.
1953	Best Plays	Mister Roberts	NBC hour-long adaption starred Arthur Kennedy, Wendell Holmes, Leon Janney, with Lane reprising Chief Johnson.
1953	Grand Central Station	The Search	With Darren McGavin, Janet Ward, Ann Shoemaker.
1953	Grand Central Station	Strange Legacy	With Scott Forbes, Jean Gillespie.

== Filmography ==
Film (by year of first release)

Year	Title	Role	Notes/source
1945	The House on 92nd Street	Admiral	Filmed in New York under the working title Now It Can Be Told.
1950	Johnny One-Eye		Filmed in New York, Lane had a small uncredited bit in this while still playing in Mister Roberts.
1951	Fourteen Hours		Henry Hathaway hired over 300 actors to do small bits in this film.
1956	The Harder They Fall	Danny McKeogh	
1956	Beyond a Reasonable Doubt	Judge	
1956	Bigger Than Life (Note: Its working title was One in a Million)	Bob LaPorte	
1957	The Shadow on the Window	Captain McQuade	Filmed in July 1956, with a working title of The Missing Witness.
1957	Fury at Showdown	Riley	
1957	Johnny Tremain	Samuel Adams	
1957	Portland Exposé	Tom Carmody	
1957	Appointment with a Shadow	Pat O'Connell	
1958	The Rawhide Trail	Captain	Filmed during October 1957, under the working title The Rawhide Breed.
1958	Damn Citizen	Police Inspector Sweeney	At least one newspaper account had the working title as Damned Citizen.
1958	High School Confidential	Desk Sergeant	
1958	Party Girl	Judge Davis	
1958	I Want to Live!	Judge	
1963	Spencer's Mountain	Dean Buck	
1964	The New Interns	Dr. Morton Gardner	
1964	Fate Is the Hunter	Supervisor	
1964	Youngblood Hawke	Gus Adam	
1967	Banning	Guard	

== Television performances 1950–1959 ==
Listed in original broadcast order

Year	Series	Episode	Role	Notes/source
1950	Hands of Destiny	"Hold Hands with the Devil"		Lane's first known television appearance was with this anthology series.
1950	The Big Story	Season 1 Episode 24: "Roy J, Battersby, New York Reporter"		
1951	Shadow of the Cloak	Season 1 Episode 2: "Mightier Than the Sword"		Both Lane and his second wife Sara Anderson were in this episode.
1951	Cameo Theatre	Season 2 Episode 1: "Special Delivery"		
1951	Hands of Destiny	Season 2 Episode 45: "The Squealer"		With Charles Lewis, Joe Silver, (Note: Silver had been another of Lane's students at Wisconsin.) and Sydma Scott.
1951	Big Town	Season 1 Episode 42: "Neighborhood Story"		
1951	Suspense	Season 3 Episode 48: "The Incident at Stony Point" (Note: IMDb has this as "The Incident at Story Point", while some contemporary newspaper listings had it as "The Incident at Stony Light".)		With Donald Buka and Russell Hardie.
1951	Crime Photographer	Season 1 Episode 14: "Sudden Death"		
1951	Somerset Maugham Theatre	"The Great Man"		Murray Matheson tangles with a jealous husband (Lane) while traveling in Peru.
1951	Crime with Father	(All 21 episodes)	Captain Jim Riland	The only TV series in which Lane starred; with Peggy Lobbin as his daughter.
1951	The Web	Season 1 Episode 57: "According to Regulations"		With Edward Binns and Harry Landers, the story of a policeman protecting an outlaw's innocent wife and son by violating departmental rules.
1952	The Web	Season 2 Episode 19: "Honeymoon at the Grand"		Stolen diamonds bring Lane, Billy Redfield, and Haila Stoddard together.
1952	The Web	Season 2 Episode 25: "The Phantom of the Bridge"		With Bobby Santon and Paul Langton.
1952	Captain Video and His Video Rangers	Season 3 Episode 4: "Birth of the Galaxy"	Porphory Pete	Lane had a recurring role on this family-orientated science fiction series.
1952	Captain Video and His Video Rangers	(Episode dated 1952-03-31)	Porphory Pete	This was a live daily show whose episode names, if any, were seldom published.
1952	Captain Video and His Video Rangers	(Episode dated 1952-06-23)	Porphory Pete	
1952	The Big Story	Season 3 Episode 34: "The Case of the Weeping Crocodile"	Frank Winge	Lane starred as a reporter who solves a murder mystery.
1952	Suspense	Season 4 Episode 36: "The Debt"	Jesse	
1952	Suspense	Season 4 Episode 41: "Fifty Beautiful Girls"		With Grace Kelly, Robert Keith Jr, Rod Steiger, and Joseph Anthony.
1952	Treasury Men in Action	"The Case of the Sparkling Alibi"		With Edward Binns and Joe Mantell.
1952	Police Story	Season 1 Episode 18: "The Newark, New Jersey Case"	Detective Sergeant Kinney	Lane stars in this true crime dramatisation.
1952	Dark of Night	Season 1 Episode 7: "Brewery"		
1952	The Adventures of Ellery Queen	Season 3 Episode 5: "Death in the Sorority House"	Sheriff	
1952	Television Playhouse	"The Darkness Below"		Drama of a coal mine cave-in starred Ralph Meeker, Mike Kellin, Gerald S. O'Loughlin, and Kim Stanley.
1953	The Web	Season 3 Episode 19: "Long Shot"		
1953	The Web	Season 4 Episode 6: "Strange Sanctuary"		With E. G. Marshall, Jack Warden, and Marion Nobel.
1953	The Web	Season 4 Episode 15: "The Blue Glass Bottle"		With Virginia Gilmore and Bill Sharon.
1953	The Big Story		Joseph O. Haff	New York Times reporter (Lane) clears man of forgery charge.
1953	You Are There	Season 1 Episode 10: "The Conquest of Mexico (1519)"	Captain de Olid	
1953	You Are There	Season 1 Episode 13: "The Signing of the Declaration of Independence (1776)"	Samuel Adams	
1953	Eye Witness	Season 1 Episode 6: "The Righteous"		Story of a lynch mob, with Henry Jones and Barbara Joyce.
1953	Jimmy Hughes, Rookie Cop	Premiere	Inspector Ferguson	With Wendy Drew.
1953	Operation Neptune	(Unknown episodes)	Admiral Bigelow	NBC short-lived fantasy series, with Ted Griffin, Richard Holland, Harold Conklin, and Jim Boles.
1953	Danger	"Windy"		Youth lives in his own dream world; with Rod Steiger and Georgianna Johnson.
1953	The Revlon Mirror Theater	Season 1 Episode 10: "One Summer's Rain"		Franchot Tone is a playwright with only one long-ago success; with Joseph Anthony and Barbara Baxley.
1953	Circle Theatre	Season 4 Episode 3: "A Story to Whisper"		Cartoonist draws comic strip from the lives of real people; with Hildy Parks and Leslie Nielsen.
1953	Kraft Theatre	Season 7 Episode 7: "Keep Our Honor Bright"	Harvey Wilson	Live NBC play, with Michael Higgins, James Dean, Addison Richards, and Joan Potter.
1953	The Man Behind the Badge	Season 1 Episode 8: "The Nebraska Story"		
1953	Danger	Season 4 Episode 11: "The Man with the Gun"		With William Prince and Norma Crane.
1953	Span of Time	(TV Movie)		
1954	Medallion Theatre	Season 2 Episode 18: "The Magic Touch"		
1954	Inner Sanctum	Season 1 Episode 1: "The Stranger"	Innkeeper	
1954	Inner Sanctum	Season 1 Episode 11: "The Sound of Birds"	Brule	
1954	Inner Sanctum	Season 1 Episode 22: "The Silent Bride"	Frisby	
1954	Inner Sanctum	Season 1 Episode 39: "Blind Luck"	Brenner	
1954	The Man Behind the Badge	Season 1 Episode 16: "The Ohio State Prison Story"		With Leslie Nielsen and Dick Moore.
1954	The Man Behind the Badge	Season 1 Episode 35: "The Case of the Mutinous Crew"		With Mario Gallo, James Bender, and Ernest Parmentier.
1954	The Web	Season 4 Episode 19: "The Barrier"		
1954	Love Story	Season 1 Episode 1: "Norma Loves Mike"		Premiere episode for this anthology series; with Betty Lou Holland and Perry Fiske.
1954	The Steel Hour	"The End of Paul Dane"		Lane played a "broad-minded cop"; with Robert Preston, Theresa Wright, and Warren Stevens.
1954	The Adventures of Ellery Queen	Season 4 Episode 5: "Buck Fever"	Sheriff	
1954	The Marriage	Season 1 Episode 1 (Premiere)	Dr. Carnahan	
1954	Circle Theatre	Season 5 Episode 4: "Explosion"		Two brothers trapped in coal mine; with Joe Maross, Frank Overton, and Alfreda Wallace.
1955	You Are There	Season 3 Episode 20: "The Death of Stonewall Jackson (May 10, 1863)"		
1955	You Are There	Season 3 Episode 21: "The First Flight of the Wright Brothers (December 17, 1903)"	Samuel P. Langley	Wilbur (James Gregory) and Orville Wright (William Prince) fly at Kitty Hawk.
1955	Appointment with Adventure	Season 1 Episode 13: "The Bridge of the Devil"	Wallace	With Paul Newman, Nehemiah Persoff, and Monica Lewis. Aired June 26, 1955.
1956	Crusader	Season 1 Episode 36: "The Secret"	Captain Jethro	
1956	Crusader	Season 2 Episode 12: "The Cop Killer"	Commander Alfred Ryan	
1956	Soldiers of Fortune	Season 2 Episode 2: "The Greater Magic"	Professor Winsby Lowe	
1956	Alfred Hitchcock Presents	Season 2 Episode 5: "None Are So Blind"	Police Detective	aired October 28, 1956
1956	Zane Grey Theater	Season 1 Episode 7: "Stage for Tucson"	Marshal Tharpe	
1956	Studio 57	Season 3 Episode 11: "The Blue Wall"	McCloud	
1957	The 20th Century Fox Hour	Season 2 Episode 8: "End of a Gun"	Telegrapher	
1957	Alfred Hitchcock Presents	Season 2 Episode 18: "The Manacled"	Train Conductor	aired January 27, 1957
1957	Alfred Hitchcock Presents	Season 2 Episode 34: "Martha Mason, Movie Star"	Police Detective	aired May 19, 1957
1957	Alfred Hitchcock Presents	Season 3 Episode 9: "The Young One"	Sheriff Matt	aired December 1, 1957
1957	General Electric Theater	Season 5 Episode 20: "No Skin Off Me"	Jasper Jones	
1957	Tales of Wells Fargo	Season 1 Episode 2: "The Hasty Gun"	Marshal Tom Ogborn	
1957	State Trooper	Season 1 Episode 23: "Death on the Rock"	Walter Johnson	
1957	Whirlybirds	Season 1 Episode 30: "Fury Canyon"	Sheriff Bates	
1957	Climax!	Season 3 Episode 45: "Necessary Evil"		
1957	Perry Mason	Season 1 Episode 4: "The Case of the Drowning Duck"	Chief Glass	
1958	Sugarfoot	Season 1 Episode 11: "Deadlock"	Jed Botts	
1958	Climax!	Season 4 Episode 17: "Four Hours in White"	Luther Reeves	Lane played father to Steve McQueen in this hospital drama.
1958	Maverick	Season 1 Episode 20: "The Savage Hills"	Marshal	
1958	Whirlybirds	Season 2 Episode 6: "Search for an Unknown Man"	Sheriff	
1958	Mike Hammer	Season 1 Episode 13: "Stay Out of Town"	Sheriff Al Miller	
1958	M Squad	Season 1 Episode 30: "The Fight"	Mel Harmon	
1958	Alfred Hitchcock Presents	Season 3 Episode 32: "Listen, Listen...!"	Father Rafferty	aired May 11, 1958
1958	Suspicion	Season 1 Episode 34: "Death Watch"	Glen Squires	
1958	Have Gun – Will Travel	Season 2 Episode 1: "The Manhunter"	Judge	
1958	Lassie	Season 5 Episode 6: "The Rocking Chair"	Joe Bascom	
1958	The Restless Gun	Season 2 Episode 5: "The Nowhere Kid"	Josiah Stevens	
1958	Wanted Dead or Alive	Season 1 Episode 9: "The Fourth Headstone"	Sheriff Sam Gladstone	
1958	Playhouse 90	Season 3 Episode 7: "Heart of Darkness"	Griggs	
1958	Man with a Camera	Season 1 Episode 10: "Six Faces of Satan"	Storekeeper	
1958	Tales of Wells Fargo	Season 3 Episode 15: "The Happy Tree"	Hank Benson	
1958	Lawman	Season 1 Episode 13: "The Master"	Cattleman Brady	
1958	The Veil	Season 1 Episode 2: "Girl on the Road"	Sheriff	
1959	Perry Mason	Season 2 Episode 14: "The Case of the Glittering Goldfish"	Harry Tiller	
1959	Union Pacific	Season 1 Episode 18: "Iron West"	Borden	
1959	Buckskin	Season 1 Episode 28: "Cousin Casey"	Moose	
1959	Wagon Train	Season 2 Episode 29: "The Clara Duncan Story"	Ron Waldron	
1959	The Real McCoys	Season 2 Episode 33: "Insurance Policy"	Mr. Simmons	
1959	The Texan	Season 1 Episode 34: "The Smiling Loser"	W. J. Morgan	
1959	M Squad	Season 2 Episode 35: "High School Bride"	Jay McCandless	
1959	One Step Beyond	Season 1 Episode 20: "Echo"	Joe the Bartender	
1959	Schlitz Playhouse	Season 8 Episode 16: "Hostage"		
1959	Tales of Wells Fargo	Season 4 Episode 1: "Young Jim Hardie"	Herman Jackson	
1959	Rescue 8	Season 2 Episode 5: "Dangerous Salvage"	Jake Randall	
1959	Man with a Camera	Season 2 Episode 3: "The Man Below"	Chief of Police	
1959	Bourbon Street Beat	Season 1 Episode 7: "Secret of Hyacinth Bayou"	Pops Polybe	
1959	Tightrope	Season 1 Episode 10: "The Money Fight"	Captain Ragland	
1959	Sugarfoot	Season 3 Episode 8: "The Gaucho"	Mike Travers	
1959	Special Agent 7	Season 1 Episode 16: "Bogus Bonds of Balaam"		

== Television performances 1960–1973 ==
Listed in original broadcast order

Year	Series	Episode	Role	Notes/source
1960	Bronco	Season 2 Episode 10: "Masquerade"	Luke Davis	
1960	The Alaskans	Season 1 Episode 17: "The Long Pursuit"	Doc Williams	
1960	The Deputy	Season 1 Episode 23: "The Two Faces of Bob Claxton"	Judge Jones	
1960	Overland Trail	Season 1 Episode 6: "All the O'Mara's Horses"	Rusty Ransom	
1960	The Detectives	Season 1 Episode 24: "Little Girl Lost"	Johnson	
1960	Peter Gunn	Season 2 Episode 28: "Slight Touch of Homicide"	Arthur Wilkie	
1960	The Twilight Zone	Season 1 Episode 35: "The Mighty Casey"	Commissioner	
1960	Bat Masterson	Season 2 Episode 37: "Barbary Castle"	Marshal	
1960	The Clear Horizon	(See Notes)	Sergeant Harry Moseby	Daily weekday episodes from July 11, 1960, to March 10, 1961, likely with occasional breaks.
1960	Tate	Season 1 Episode 12: "Quiet After the Storm"	Jesse	
1960	Harrigan and Son	"Junior Joins the Law Firm"	The Judge	Premiere episode for this series.
1960	Alfred Hitchcock Presents	Season 6 Episode 3: "Very Moral Theft"	Mr. Ivers	aired October 11, 1960
1960	The Roaring 20's	Season 1 Episode 1: "Burnett's Woman"	Commissioner	
1960	One Step Beyond	Season 3 Episode 5: "If You See Sally"	Mr. Casey	
1960	The Real McCoys	Season 4 Episode 9: "The Hermit"	Sheriff	
1960	Shotgun Slade	Season 1 Episode 18: "The Lady and the Piano"	Doctor	
1961	The Bob Cummings Show	Season 1 Episode 1: "Executive Sweet"		
1961	87th Precinct	Season 1 Episode 2: "Lady in Waiting"	Sergeant Murchison	
1961	The Roaring 20's	Season 2 Episode 5: "Another Time, Another War"	Commissioner	
1961	Bonanza	Season 3 Episode 8: "The Friendship"	Warden	
1962	87th Precinct	Season 1 Episode 18: "Out of Order"	The Desk Sergeant	
1962	87th Precinct	Season 1 Episode 20: "A Bullet for Katie"	Sergeant Murchison	
1962	Outlaws	Season 2 Episode 16: "A Bit of Glory"	Joe	
1962	Lassie	Season 8 Episode 23: "The Odyssey Part 1"	Mike Finch	
1962	Alfred Hitchcock Presents	Season 7 Episode 20: "The Test"	The Judge	aired February 20, 1962
1962	The Clear Horizon	(See Notes)	Sergeant Harry Moseby	Daily weekday episodes from February 27, 1962, to June 15, 1962, likely with occasional breaks.
1962	Adventures in Paradise	Season 3 Episode 25: "The Baby Sitters"	Brady	
1962	The Tall Man	Season 2 Episode 38: "Phoebe"	Trager	
1962	The Alfred Hitchcock Hour	Season 1 Episode 4: "I Saw the Whole Thing"	Judge B. Martin	aired October 11, 1962
1962	Sam Benedict	Season 1 Episode 8: "Hear the Mellow Wedding Bells"	Court Clerk Kelly	
1962	Sam Benedict	Season 1 Episode 9: "Life Is a Lie, Love Is a Cheat"	Court Clerk Kelly	
1962	Sam Benedict	Season 1 Episode 10: "The Bird of Warning"	Court Clerk Kelly	
1962	Sam Benedict	Season 1 Episode 13: "Too Many Strangers"	Court Clerk Kelly	
1962	77 Sunset Strip	Season 5 Episode 12: "The Snow Job Caper"	Police Chief Austin	
1963	Sam Benedict	Season 1 Episode 20: "Run Softly, Oh Softly"	Court Clerk Kelly	
1963	The Virginian	Season 1 Episode 23: "The Money Cage"	Ezra Griswold	
1963	Wagon Train	Season 6 Episode 24: "The Emmett Lawton Story"	Del Masters	
1963	Death Valley Days	Season 11 Episode 24: "Coffin for a Coward"	Billy Johnson	
1963	Death Valley Days	Season 12 Episode 5: "Deadly Decision"	Judge	
1963	My Three Sons	Season 3 Episode 33: "Total Recall"	Skipper Thompson	
1963	Arrest and Trial	Season 1 Episode 4: "A Shield Is for Hiding Behind"	Wright	
1963	Temple Houston	Season 1 Episode 4: "Toll the Bell Slowly"	Poag	
1963	Lassie	Season 10 Episode 9: "Lassie and the Winged Enemy"	Freight Train Conductor	
1963	The Alfred Hitchcock Hour	Season 2 Episode 9: "The Dividing Wall"	Otto Brandt	aired December 6, 1963
1964	Kraft Suspense Theatre	Season 1 Episode 11: "The Deep End"	Doc Stacey	
1964	Hazel	Season 3 Episode 18: "Scheherazade and Her Frying Pan: Part 1"	Fisherman #1	
1964	Hazel	Season 3 Episode 19: "Scheherazade and Her Frying Pan: Part 2"	Fisherman #1	
1964	Mr. Novak	Season 1 Episode 21: "I'm on the Outside"	Lieutenant Comerford	
1964	Kraft Suspense Theatre	Season 1 Episode 28: "A Cruel and Unusual Night"	Warden	
1964	McHale's Navy	Season 3 Episode 15: "Fuji's Big Romance"	Chief Wabango	
1965	Dr. Kildare	Season 4 Episode 24: "All Brides Should Be Beautiful"	Gus Markham	
1965	Gunsmoke	Season 11 Episode 1: "Seven Hours to Dawn"	Johnson	
1965	Peyton Place	Season 2 Episode 22 (1965-11-01)	Jim Fogerty	Few actors in Hollywood escaped doing a bit part in this series.
1965	Peyton Place	Season 2 Episode 27 (1965-11-11)	Jim Fogerty	
1965	The F.B.I.	Season 1 Episode 14: "Pound of Flesh"	Mayor Russell	
1966	Branded	Season 2 Episode 21: "Nice Day for a Hanging"	Sheriff	
1966	The Fugitive	Season 3 Episode 30: "Coralee"	Frank Reynolds	
1966	Bonanza	Season 8 Episode 11: "The Oath"	Fielding	
1967	Death Valley Days	Season 15 Episode 18: "A Wrangler's Last Ride"	Pa Roberts	
1967	The Big Valley	Season 3 Episode 4: "Time After Midnight"	Chairman Gaines	
1967	Bonanza	Season 9 Episode 4: "Judgment at Olympus"	Judge	
1967	Judd, for the Defense	Season 1 Episode 13: "To Love and Stand Mute"	Dr. Davis	
1968	Batman	Season 3 Episode 17: "The Joke's on Catwoman"	Judge	
1968	Death Valley Days	Season 16 Episode 16: "Britta Goes Home"	Preacher	
1968	The Virginian	Season 6 Episode 26: "Seth"	Sheriff Calder	Lane's daughter Sara Lane was a regular cast member when he did this episode.
1968	Judd, for the Defense	Season 2 Episode 1: "In a Puff of Smoke"	Magistrate Edgar Brown	
1968	Walt Disney's Wonderful World of Color	Season 15 Episode 2: "Boomerang, Dog of Many Talents: Part 1"	F. M. Higbee	
1968	Walt Disney's Wonderful World of Color	Season 15 Episode 3: "Boomerang, Dog of Many Talents: Part 2"	F. M. Higbee	
1968	This Is the Life	Old Smiley		
1970	Gunsmoke	Season 16 Episode 3: "Stark"	Bo	
1971	Dan August	Season 1 Episode 25: "Prognosis: Homicide"	Bearded Janitor	
1972	Gunsmoke	Season 17 Episode 23: "Alias Festus Haggen"	Sheriff Buckley	
1972	The Mod Squad	Season 5 Episode 3: "Yesterday's Ashes"	The Seadog	
1973	Gunsmoke	Season 19 Episode 11: "The Hanging of Newly O'Brien"	Grandpa	
