= Time, Inc. v. Hill =

- Supreme Court of the United States

Argued April 27, 1966 Decided January 9, 1967
- Full case name: Time, Inc. v. James J. Hill
- Citations: 385 U.S. 374 (more) 87 S. Ct. 534; 17 L. Ed. 2d 456; 1967 U.S. LEXIS 2991
- Argument: Oral argument
- Reargument: Reargument
- Opinion announcement: Opinion announcement

Case history
- Prior: New York Court of Appeals: 15 N.Y.2d 986, 207 N.E.2d 604, 260 N.Y.S. 7. New York Supreme Court, Appellate Division: 204 N.Y.S. 286.
- Subsequent: None

Holding
- "Erroneous statements about a matter of public interest ... are inevitable, and, if innocent or merely negligent, must be protected if 'freedoms of expression are to have the breathing space' that they 'need to survive.'"

Court membership
- Chief Justice Earl Warren Associate Justices Hugo Black · William O. Douglas; Tom C. Clark · John M. Harlan II; William J. Brennan Jr. · Potter Stewart; Byron White · Abe Fortas

Case opinions
- Majority: Brennan, joined by Black, Douglas, Stewart, White
- Concurrence: Black, joined by Douglas
- Concurrence: Douglas
- Concur/dissent: Harlan
- Dissent: Fortas, joined by Warren, Clark

Laws applied
- U.S. Const. amend. I

Time, Inc. v. Hill, 385 U.S. 374 (1967), is a United States Supreme Court case involving issues of privacy in balance with the First Amendment to the United States Constitution and principles of freedom of speech. The Court held 6–3 that the latter requires that merely negligent intrusions into the former by the media not be civilly actionable. It expanded that principle from its landmark defamation holding in New York Times v. Sullivan.

The Hill family had sued after Life implied in a blurb that the upcoming film adaptation of The Desperate Hours was based on the real-life incident where they were held hostage in their home by escaped convicts. It was accompanied by a photo of the Hills' house in a suburb of Philadelphia, from which they had moved shortly afterwards due to the lingering psychological effects of the episode. In fact, the plot of the novel and a successful play based on it were, while inspired by the Hills' experience, unrelated to it.

Former Vice President Richard M. Nixon argued the Hills' case before the Court.

== Background ==
James Hill and his wife lived in Whitemarsh Township, Pennsylvania, with their five children in 1952, when they were taken hostage in their own house by three escaped convicts. During the ordeal, the family members were treated with dignity by the hostage-takers. The family members were held hostage for 19 hours. The three criminals were apprehended after leaving the Hills' home, and the incident received significant media attention. Mrs. Hill did not appreciate the media focus, and the family relocated to Connecticut in order to seek out a lifestyle out of the limelight.

Logo of Life magazine

Joseph Hayes wrote a novel published in 1953 called The Desperate Hours, which was influenced by the Hill family's ordeal. The novel by Hayes went on to become a bestseller. In 1954, the Broadway theatre production of the play The Desperate Hours debuted, which depicted a hostage incident similar to that experienced by the Hill family. However, in The Desperate Hours, the scenario was changed from the Hills' actual experiences, to a fictional portrayal of a family victimized by threats of sexual abuse and other violent acts. The setting for the play was Indianapolis, Indiana.

Life magazine published an article on the debut of The Desperate Hours on Broadway, and included pictures of the actors in the prior residence of the Hills in the Whitemarsh suburb of Philadelphia, Pennsylvania. In the article, The Desperate Hours was characterized as a "reenactment" of the ordeal experienced by the Hill family. The Life magazine piece wrote that the photographed actors from the play were pictured in "the actual house where the Hills were besieged". Mrs. Hill experienced a mental breakdown after the piece was published, and James Hill stated he was unable to comprehend why the magazine did not fact check the article through communication with the family.

== Prior litigation ==
James Hill filed suit in New York against the magazine's publisher, Time, Inc. The suit asserted Life had violated privacy law in the state, by conflating the Hill family with fictional events which had not actually occurred. The legal argument drew upon the notion of false light as related to privacy law. After an initial ruling against Life magazine, the New York Supreme Court, Appellate Division remanded the case for a new trial. After litigation through the court system in New York, a decision was found in favor of the plaintiff, with damages awarded of US$30,000.

== Supreme Court ==
=== Argument ===
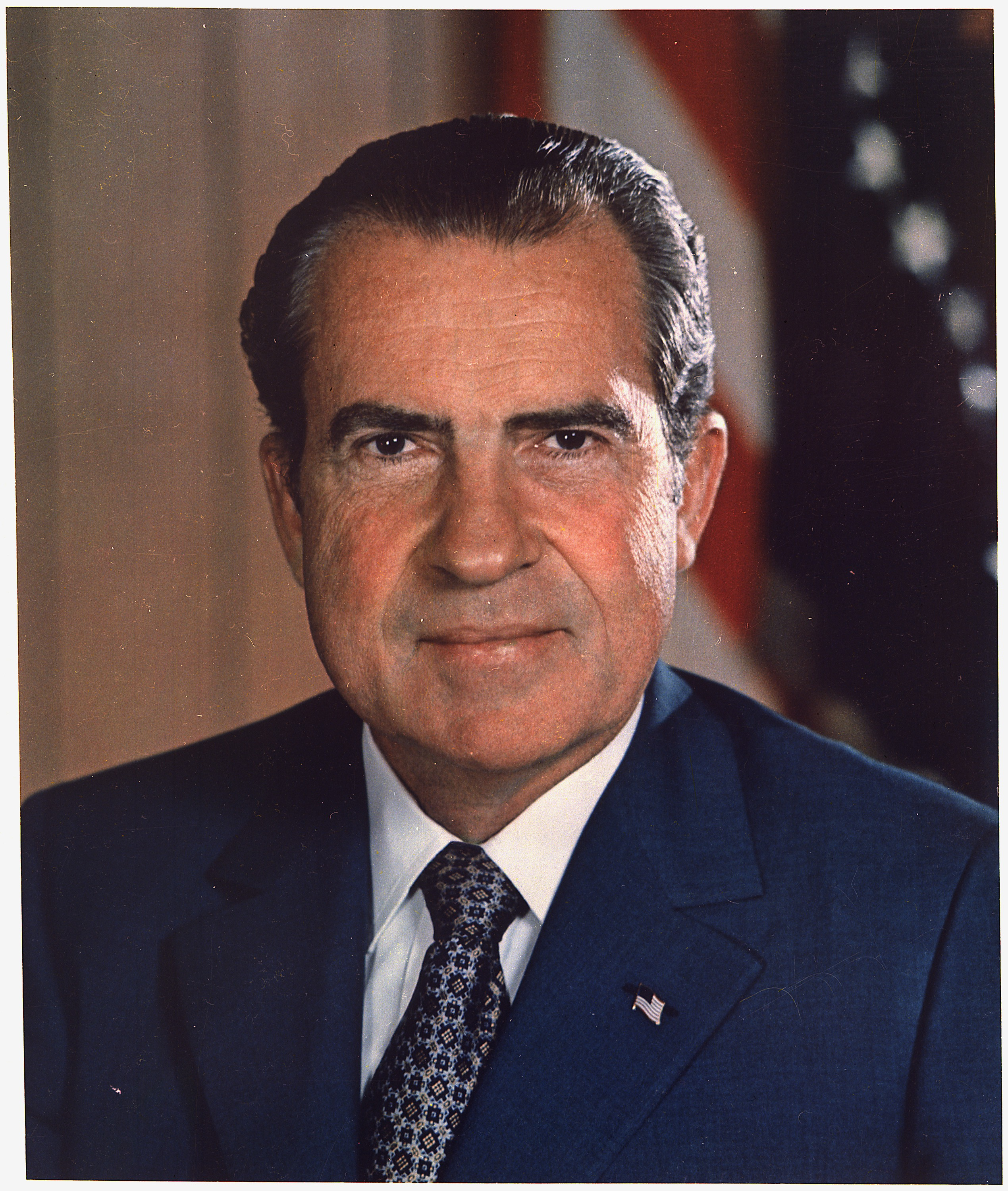
Richard Nixon argued the Hill position before the Supreme Court.

Time, Inc. appealed the matter to the U.S. Supreme Court, where the Hill family position was argued by former Vice President Richard Nixon, who was elected president two years later.

The position of Life magazine was argued before the Court by attorney Harold Medina Jr., son of U.S. federal judge Harold Medina. In his opening argument, he asserted that the privacy law in question in New York was unconstitutional, due to its broadness and for punitively impacting the press for publishing factual information. As a secondary argument, Medina put forth the notion that the prior ruling in the case was inappropriate because the jury was allowed to determine liability of Life based on the inaccuracy of the article, while neglecting to take into account whether or not the act by the magazine was reckless or willful. He put forth the potential for a lawsuit against the press for a simple unintentional error, "It comes down to if you treat it on a mistake basis, on truth or falsity, what has happened to the law of libel? You don't need the law of libel any more and the safeguards. It is much easier to sue for violation of your right of privacy. But all the defenses that have been set up in the libel law disappear."

Regarding his preparation for the case, Nixon remarked to The New York Times journalist Fred Graham, "I locked myself up in my office for two weeks. No phone calls. No interruptions. It takes a tremendous amount of concentration." Graham later wrote of Nixon's argumentation, "Whatever the peculiarities of Nixon's preparation, his performance before the Court proved sound and workman-like, well within the bounds of effective oral advocacy." Nixon argued that a fictional account is not newsworthy, and therefore freedom of the press is not impacted by the privacy law. His essential premise put forth the notion that the "fictionalization" aspect of privacy law did not harm freedom of expression.

=== Unpublished draft opinion ===
In his 1985 book The Unpublished Opinions of the Warren Court, author Bernard Schwartz revealed that an initial conference had resulted in votes of 6 to 3 to affirm the judgment in favor of the Hill family. Justice Abe Fortas wrote a draft opinion, but it was not published by the Court.

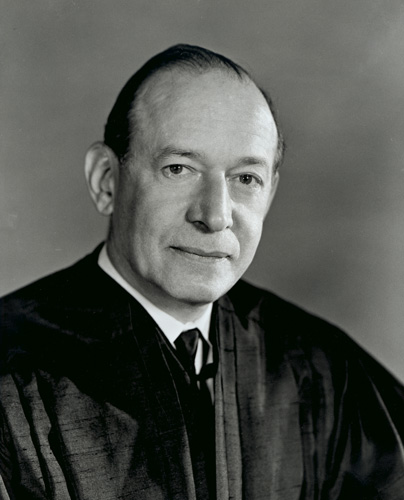
Justice Abe Fortas wrote an unpublished initial draft opinion of the Court in the case.

After the 1985 publication of Schwartz's book revealed the initial draft opinion of the Court in the case, former President Richard Nixon requested his prior White House Counsel Leonard Garment to investigate the matter. Garment had previously worked with Nixon as his legal partner, and assisted him during the Time, Inc. v. Hill case. Garment contributed an article to The New Yorker which reported on the research undertaken by Nixon before each of the arguments in the case. He recounted Nixon's response after hearing of the verdict of the Court, "I always knew I wouldn't be permitted to win a big appeal against the press." Garment emphasized a comment from the dissent opinion written by Justice Harlan, which warned undesired media attention imparted "severe risk of irremediable harm ... [to] individuals exposed to it and powerless to protect themselves against it."

Following the first argument before the Court, justices changed their opinions about the matter, and Justice Hugo Black wrote in a memo to his fellow justices, "After mature reflection, I am unable to recall any prior case in this Court that offers a greater threat to freedom of speech and press than this one does." Justice Black emphasized that though the media makes mistakes at times in its reporting, requiring press organizations to pay out for claims which were not libel related to inaccuracies which did not hurt individuals' reputation, would engender a situation of self-censorship. A subsequent argument was ordered, and the majority opinion shifted since the initial draft opinion.

=== Reargument ===
A second argument before the Court took place in October 1966. Medina requested the Court declare the privacy law in question unconstitutional, because, "[i]n this field of privacy, I merely suggest that when it is nondefamatory and when you are talking about a public fact, we should have the protection that the fellow who comes in to sue us must prove both falsity and knowledge of falsity, or recklessness, and that this is a minimum, because, mind you, this article here, the dissent in the appellate division, found it was an informative presentation of legitimate news."

In his reply to Medina's argumentation, Nixon stated, "It is our contention that in this case it was argued by the plaintiff, it was established by the evidence, it was charged by the court, it was found by the jury, and it was held by the courts of New York in their appeals courts, that Life magazine lied, and that Life magazine knew that it lied. That is the proposition that I content for here."

However, the trial judge in the initial case did not provide the jury with an instruction that it had to provide an opinion of recklessness or willful inaccuracy on the part of Life magazine in order to yield a decision in favor of the plaintiff. Medina concluded the reargument period by emphasizing his view that in case it was determined by the Court that evidence showed the Life magazine staff was aware of the inaccuracy of the article in question, this lack of jury instruction was crucial. Medina said that due to this failure to inform the jury of a requirement to find willful inaccuracy on the part of Life magazine, "I still think I am entitled to win."

=== Decision ===
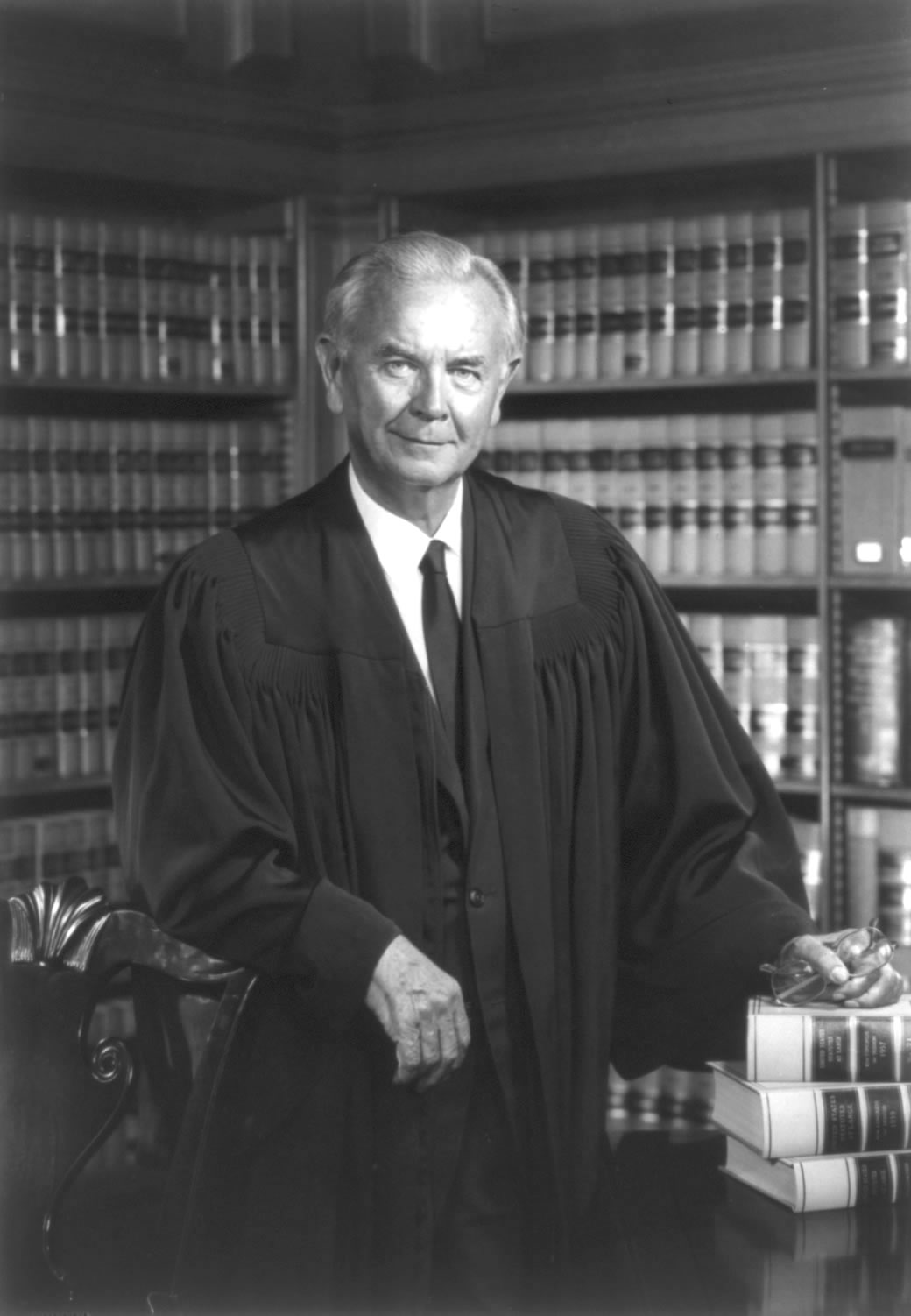
Justice William J. Brennan, Jr. wrote the opinion of the Court.

In January 1967, the Court determined in a 5–4 decision in favor of Time, Inc. Justice William J. Brennan, Jr. wrote the opinion of the Court. Justice Brennan had previously written the majority opinion in the case of New York Times Co. v. Sullivan in 1964; that case ruled individual officials who were publicly known were not able to obtain claims for inaccurate media coverage except in the case of reckless or willful reporting of said inaccuracies. In this case, Justice Brennan utilized a similar test to the matter at hand. He permitted that Life could have a fresh trial where it could be determined whether or not the magazine's reporting was reckless or willfully inaccurate. Justice Brennan wrote about the balance between freedom of speech and exposure to public view:

The guarantees for speech and press are not the preserve of political expression or comment upon public affairs, essential as those are to healthy government. One need only pick up any newspaper or magazine to comprehend the vast range of published matter which exposes persons to public view, both private citizens and public officials. Exposure of the self to others in varying degrees is a concomitant of life in a civilized community. The risk of this exposure is an essential incident of life in a society which places a primary value on freedom of speech and press.

The majority opinion held that states cannot judge in favor of plaintiffs "to redress false reports of matters of public interest in the absence of proof that the defendant published the report with knowledge of its falsity or reckless disregard of the truth". This decision had the impact of elaborating on the "actual malice" standard of the Court's prior holding in New York Times Co. v. Sullivan, to also include cases involving false light. Although the Court reversed a judgment for compensatory damages, it recognized a clear right not to be spoken about.

A dissent written by Justice Fortas was joined by Justice Tom C. Clark as well as Chief Justice Earl Warren. In addition to Justice Fortas, Justice John Marshall Harlan II wrote another dissent. Justice Harlan observed that as Hill was not a public individual, he was unable to obtain significant viewership for a potential response. He pointed out that this created a problem of "unchallengable untruth", and stated a necessity would have been to request Hill prove negligence on the part of Life magazine's editorship in their falsehoods, as opposed to the more stringent test of proving that the inaccuracy was actually reckless or willful.

== Analysis ==
In his book Freedom for the Thought That We Hate: A Biography of the First Amendment, author Anthony Lewis examined the case, and noted, "Using someone's likeness without permission has developed as one of the four branches of privacy law. A second is false light privacy, exemplified by the Hill case: putting someone in a false light by, for example, fictionalizing a story about him or her."

Authors Lyrissa Barnett Lidsky and R. George Wright write in their book Freedom of the Press: A Reference Guide to the United States Constitution, "... the Supreme Court requires proof of falsity and fault in all defamation cases involving matters of public concern, although the requisite fault depends on the status of the plaintiff. If plaintiffs were able to avoid these requirements simply by choosing to sue for false light rather than defamation, it would encourage an 'end run' around the First Amendment. The United States Supreme Court foresaw and partially prevented this problem in its first false light case, Time, Inc. v. Hill." Regarding the rationale of the decision by the Supreme Court in the case, the authors noted, "The Court's reasoning was parallel to the reasoning being developed in defamation cases: Errors are inevitable in free debate on matters of public interest, and the press must have breathing space to protect it from liability for such 'inevitable' errors."

Writing as a contributor to A Good Quarrel: America's Top Legal Reporters Share Stories from Inside the Supreme Court, Fred Graham commented on the positions of Time, Inc. in its argumentation before the Court. Graham noted, "Underlying both defenses was the argument that if this judgment was not unconstitutional, then persons who feel they have been defamed can perform an end run around the defenses established in New York Times v. Sullivan by suing for a violation of privacy."

== See also ==
- Alien and Sedition Acts
- Civil liberties in the United States
- Censorship in the United States
- Freedom of speech in the United States
- List of United States Supreme Court cases by the Warren Court
- List of United States Supreme Court cases, volume 385
- List of United States Supreme Court cases involving the First Amendment
- Media transparency
- Westmoreland v. CBS (S.D.N.Y. 1982)
- Tory v. Cochran 544 U.S. 734 (2005)
