= False light =

Type of tort

In United States law, false light is a tort concerning privacy that is similar to the tort of defamation. The privacy laws in the U.S. include a non-public person's right to protection from publicity that creates an untrue or misleading impression about them. That right is balanced against the First Amendment right of free speech.

False light differs from defamation primarily in being intended "to protect the plaintiff's mental or emotional well-being", rather than to protect a plaintiff's reputation as is the case with the tort of defamation, and in being about the impression created rather than being about veracity. If a publication of information is false, then a tort of defamation might have occurred. If that communication is not technically false but is still misleading, then a tort of false light might have occurred.

False light privacy claims often arise under the same facts as defamation cases, and therefore not all states recognize false light actions. There is a subtle difference in the way courts view the legal theories: false light cases are about damage to a person's personal feelings or dignity, whereas defamation is about damage to a person's reputation.

The specific elements of the tort of false light vary considerably, even among those jurisdictions which do recognize this tort. Generally, these elements consist of the following:

- A publication by the defendant about the plaintiff;
- made with actual malice if the plaintiff is a public figure;
- which places the plaintiff in a false light;
- and that would be highly offensive (i.e., embarrassing to reasonable persons).

Some U.S. state courts have ruled that false light lawsuits brought under their states' laws must be rewritten as defamation lawsuits; these courts generally base their opinion on the premises that a) any publication or statement giving rise to a false-light claim will also give rise to a defamation claim, such that the set of statements creating false light is necessarily, although not by definition, entirely within the set of statements constituting defamation; and b) the standard of what would be "highly offensive" or "embarrassing" to a reasonable person is much more difficult to apply than is the state's standard for defamation, such that the potential penalties for violating the former standard would have an unconstitutional or otherwise unacceptable chilling effect on the media. However, "most states do allow false light claims to be brought, even where a defamation claim would suffice." Some of the states do not recognize the false light claim due to the similarity between false light and defamation, as well as the possible impact on free speech. Some states that do recognize it will not allow a plaintiff to maintain suit for both false light and defamation.

== Examples ==
In Cason v. Baskin (1945), the Florida Supreme Court held that statements made in a book about a woman who "lived a quiet and private life," even if truthful, could nevertheless be the basis of a claim for invasion of privacy where the matters disclosed — in this case, the plaintiff's use of profanity — were not of "general or public interest." But this case did not necessarily establish a tort of false light, because there was no element of falsity required.

In Gill v. Curtis Publishing Co. (1952), the magazine Ladies Home Journal published an article criticizing "love at first sight" as being based solely on sexual attraction, and accompanied this article with a photograph of a couple. The couple sued, claiming the magazine had created a false impression of their love as "wrong" and likely to end in divorce. The California Supreme Court reversed the trial court, finding that the couple stated a common law claim for invasion of privacy. Previously, in Melvin v. Reid (1931), a California court had found that the right to privacy originated not in the common law but in the California constitution.

The case of Warren E. Spahn v. Julian Messner, Inc. (1967), is a leading New York Court of Appeals court case involving the civil tort of false light that involved, among other things, a knowing lie about a military decoration. Julian Messner, Inc. published a supposed biography of baseball great Warren Spahn, written by one Milton Shapiro; the biography was aimed at children. The biography was largely fictionalized but, in keeping with its genre and target audience, did not say things that made Spahn look bad (and thus was not libelous). Rather, the biography made him look more heroic than he was by, for example, falsely claiming that he had earned a Bronze Star. Spahn sought an injunction to prevent publication of this book, The Warren Spahn Story. The New York court ruled in Spahn's favor. The court blocked further publication of the book and ordered the defendants to pay damages in the amount of $10,000. Messner appealed. In its ruling, the New York court held that such speech was constitutionally unprotected, and therefore could give rise to a tort recovery, simply because of the emotional distress that the falsehoods caused Spahn. To this day, this is a classic and often-cited example of speech actionable under the false light tort and has been used in court decisions all across the country.

In the 1967 case of Time, Inc. v. Hill, the Supreme Court of the United States invalidated a false light privacy judgment for the Hill family in the absence of proof of actual malice. James Hill and his family were held up for a day in 1952 by three escaped convicts in their home near Philadelphia. The convicts eventually released the Hill family without harm or injury. Joseph Hayes wrote a novel about the story titled The Desperate Hours, which would later be made into a Broadway play. Hayes’ work portrayed a family, similar to the Hills, but in Hayes’ story, the family is treated with considerable violence while held hostage. Life magazine published an article in 1955 "describing the play as a re-enactment, and using as illustrations photographs of scenes staged in the former Hill home." The Hill family sued Time, Inc., publisher of Life, for invasion of privacy, reasoning that Life magazine was using their name and experience in order to increase circulation and to attract more people to the play. Time, Inc. argued that the issue was of public concern and was "published in good faith without any malice whatsoever." Justice William Brennan, speaking for a five-member majority of the Court, wrote that a showing of innocent or negligent false reportage is insufficient to collect damages for a false light claim. Justice John Marshall Harlan II, writing in dissent, opined that the actual malice standard, as set forth by the Court three years earlier in New York Times Co. v. Sullivan, was too stringent for false light privacy cases.

A Fifth Circuit case, Braun v. Flynt (1984), helps elucidate the distinction between false light and defamation. Jeannie Braun was an entertainer who performed an amusement park act involving a swimming pig. Through deception, a company owned by Larry Flynt, "obtained her picture [with the pig] and placed it in a magazine of nationwide circulation devoted to the publication of lewd pictures of women and to sexual exploitation." A jury awarded Braun $30,000 on her defamation claim and $55,000 on her false light claims. The Fifth Circuit, however, held that Mrs. Braun could not recover under both theories, because they arose "from a single publication." Nonetheless, the court instructed that if Braun waived her defamation claim, the district court should enter judgment on the false light claim. The court explained that the "facts of this case and the nature of the damages suffered – primarily, personal humiliation, embarrassment, pain and suffering – fit more precisely the 'false light' invasion of privacy theory than they do the defamation theory."

In Peoples Bank & Trust Co. v. Globe Int'l, Inc. (1992), a tabloid newspaper printed the picture of a 96-year-old Arkansas woman next to the headline "SPECIAL DELIVERY: World's oldest newspaper carrier, 101, quits because she's pregnant! I guess walking all those miles kept me young." The woman (who in fact was not pregnant), Nellie Mitchell, who had run a small newsstand on the town square since 1963, prevailed at trial under a theory of false light invasion of privacy. She was awarded damages of $1.5M. The tabloid appealed, generally disputing the offensiveness and falsity of the photograph, arguing that Mitchell had not actually been injured, and claiming that Mitchell had failed to prove that any employee of the tabloid knew or had reason to know that its readers would conclude that the story about the pregnant carrier related to the photograph printed alongside. The court of appeals rejected all of the tabloid's arguments, holding that “[i]t may be. . .that Mrs. Mitchell does not show a great deal of obvious injury, but. . . Nellie Mitchell's experience could be likened to that of a person who had been dragged slowly through a pile of untreated sewage. . . [and] few would doubt that substantial damage had been inflicted by the one doing the dragging.”

In a case against Playgirl magazine, Solano v. Playgirl, Inc. (2002), actor Jose Solano Jr. won a false light claim because of the placement of headlines around his cover photo. The court said the gist of the magazine's cover—which featured headlines like "12 Sizzling Centerfolds Ready to Score With You" and "TV Guys. Primetime's Sexy Young Stars Exposed"—put Solano in a false light by suggesting he might be pictured nude inside the magazine, even though the cover could not have given rise to a defamation claim." The case was then later reversed due to the fact that he was a limited public figure and that the magazine was "newsworthy".

== See also ==
- Color (law)
- Privacy laws of the United States
- United States free speech exceptions
