= Harold Medina Jr. =

American judge

- Born: Harold Raymond Medina Jr. October 19, 1912; New York City, U.S.
- Died: February 17, 1991 (aged 78); Village of Golf, Florida, U.S.
- Education: Princeton University (AB); Columbia University (LLB)
- Occupation: Trial attorney
- Years active: 1937–1974
- Employer: Cravath, Swaine & Moore
- Known for: Defense of Life magazine in 1967 over invasion of privacy by 1955 Broadway play The Desperate Hours
- Spouse: Janet Williams
- Children: 3
- Parents: Harold Medina (father); Ethel Forde Hillyer (mother)
- Relatives: Standish Medina (brother)

Harold Raymond Medina Jr. (October 19, 1912 – February 17, 1991) was an American trial lawyer and expert in libel, privacy, and copyright, who spent his career with the law firm of Cravath, Swaine & Moore.

== Early life and education ==
Medina was born in New York City, the son of Judge Harold R. Medina Sr. and Ethel Forde Hillyer. He had a brother, Standish, who also became a New York City lawyer. He graduated from The Hill School. He received a B.A., summa cum laude, from Princeton University and in 1937 a law degree from Columbia University.

== Career ==
In 1937, Medina joined the law firm of Cravath, Swaine & Moore and spent his entire career there, reaching partner in 1949 and retiring in 1974.

=== Hiss case ===
During the Hiss Case (1948–1950), Medina represented Time in the defense of its senior editor Whittaker Chambers. In his memoir, Chambers explained his role:

Once Hiss sued me, Time, with its usual generosity, came to my aid. The magazine took the position that in charging me with libel, Hiss had impugned my veracity, not merely as an individual man, but as an editor of Time. Time, therefore, had a direct concern in my vindication.

For one reason or another, which I did not seek to explore, I was never privy to the exact arrangements made by Time. But I was presently informed that the costs of the legal defense had been, in so far as possible, lifted from me. Some of the costs I must unavoidably bear. Time's interests in the Case were looked after by Harold Medina Jr., son of the now celebrated judge who was soon to preside over the long trial of the Communist leaders. It was sometimes necessary for me to confer with young Medina. I learned that now I had investigators of my own.

Note: Their business was not to pry into Hiss's family history or finances—matters that were never publicly touched upon by any member of my counsel, by the Government's prosecutor or by me, and that not because no startling facts came to light. My investigators worked almost wholly to locate witnesses who could corroborate my story about Hiss. Nearly always, they found that Hiss's investigators had been there first and that possible witnesses had sometimes suffered strange black-outs of recollection. My investigators soon passed out of the picture.

In early December 1948, Chambers conferred with Medina about his employment with Time. Medina assured him "In six weeks this whole thing will be forgotten and you will be back at work as usual." He escorted Chambers to a meeting at Time headquarters, where Chambers decided he should nevertheless resign. (Less than two weeks later, the U.S. Department of Justice indicted Hiss on two counts of perjury, which turned into two trials that ended with sentencing in January 1950.)

When Chambers sought his advice on picking counsel in New York City during the Hiss trials, Medina received a call from congressional representative Richard M. Nixon. Nixon told Medina that Kodak had found that the microfilm from the "Pumpkin Papers" did not exist until 1945 (and not in 1938), the date of Chambers' microfilm. Chambers attempted suicide that evening, failed, and then learned from Kodak next morning that they had made an error: Kodak had merely discontinued production of that kind of microfilm during WWII.

=== Time v. Hill case ===
In 1967, Medina won a 5-to-4 US Supreme Court vote on Time, Inc. v. Hill, 385 U.S. 374, in a suit brought by a family that claimed invasion of privacy based on portrayal of family members in a review of the 1955 Broadway play, The Desperate Hours. He argued that "articles or broadcasts that give a false impression of a person do not constitute an invasion of privacy unless the falsehood is published deliberately or recklessly", thus extending constitutional protections of the press.

== Personal and death ==
Medina married Janet Williams. They had three children, Harold R. Medina III, Robert Medina and Ann Medina Welch.

He died from lung cancer on February 17, 1991, at home in Village of Golf, Florida, at the age of 78. His father had died eleven months earlier at the age of 102.
