= 9th Tony Awards =

1955 US theatrical awards ceremony

- Date: March 27, 1955
- Location: Plaza Hotel; New York City, New York
- Hosted by: Frank Sinatra
- Most wins: The Pajama Game and Peter Pan (3)

Television/radio coverage
- Network: NBC Radio Network

The 9th Annual Tony Awards, presented by the American Theatre Wing, took place at the Plaza Hotel Grand Ballroom on March 27, 1955. It was broadcast on radio by the National Broadcasting Company. The presenter was Helen Hayes and music was composed and presented by Meyer Davis and his Orchestra.

== Award winners ==
Sources: Infoplease BroadwayWorld

=== Production ===
Award	Winner
Best Play	The Desperate Hours by Joseph Hayes. Produced by Howard Erskine and Joseph Hayes.
Best Musical	The Pajama Game. Book by George Abbott and Richard Bissell, music and lyrics by Richard Adler and Jerry Ross. Produced by Frederick Brisson, Robert Griffith, and Harold Prince.

=== Performance ===
Award	Winner
Best Actor in Play	Alfred Lunt, Quadrille
Best Actress in a Play	Nancy Kelly, The Bad Seed
Best Actor in a Musical	Walter Slezak, Fanny
Best Actress in a Musical	Mary Martin, Peter Pan
Best Supporting or Featured Actor in a Play	Francis L. Sullivan, Witness for the Prosecution
Best Supporting or Featured Actress in a Play	Patricia Jessel, Witness for the Prosecution
Best Supporting or Featured Actor in a Musical	Cyril Ritchard, Peter Pan
Best Supporting or Featured Actress in a Musical	Carol Haney, The Pajama Game

=== Craft ===
Award	Winner
Director-Play	Robert Montgomery, The Desperate Hours
Choreographer	Bob Fosse, The Pajama Game
Scenic Designer	Oliver Messell, House of Flowers
Costume Designer	Cecil Beaton, Quadrille
Best Conductor and Musical Director	Thomas Schippers, The Saint of Bleecker Street
Tony Award for Best Stage Technician	Richard Rodda, Peter Pan

== Special award ==
- Proscenium Productions, an Off-Broadway company at the Cherry Lane Theatre, for generally high quality and viewpoint shown in The Way of the World and Thieves Carnival. Presented to Warren Enters, Robert Merriman and Sybil Trubin.

=== Multiple nominations and awards ===
The following productions received multiple awards.

- 3 wins: The Pajama Game and Peter Pan
- 2 wins: The Desperate Hours, Quadrille and Witness for the Prosecution

== See also ==
- 27th Academy Awards
