= 36 Ghante =

1974 Indian Hindi film

- Original poster
- Directed by: Raj Tilak
- Starring: Sunil Dutt; Raaj Kumar; Mala Sinha; Vijay Arora; Parveen Babi; Ranjeet; Danny Denzongpa
- Music by: Sapan Chakraborty
- Release date: 1 July 1974
- Country: India
- Language: Hindi

36 Ghante (transl. 36 Hours) is a 1974 Hindi film directed by Raj Tilak. It stars Sunil Dutt, Raaj Kumar, Mala Sinha, Vijay Arora, Parveen Babi, Ranjeet, Danny Denzongpa in pivotal roles. It is a remake of the 1955 American film The Desperate Hours, which was adapted from Joseph Hayes' 1954 novel.

== Plot ==
Three jailed convicts Himmat, his brother Ajit, and Dilawar Khan break out of prison and take over the household of Editor Ashok Rai. The escapees hold Ashok Rai, his wife Deepa Rai, son, Rajoo, and Ashok's sister Naina hostage. The convicts plan to continue to hold the family hostage until their associate, Kamini, contacts them in person. The police investigation into their escape is coordinated by Inspector R.D. Wadekar, who has no clue of to the whereabouts of the convicts.

== Cast ==
- Sunil Dutt as Himmat Singh
- Raaj Kumar as Editor Ashok Rai
- Mala Sinha as Deepa Rai
- Vijay Arora as Vijay
- Parveen Babi as Naina Rai
- Ranjeet as Ajit Singh
- Danny Denzongpa as Dilawar Khan
- Iftekhar as Vijay's Father
- Urmila Bhatt as Vijay's Mother
- Ramesh Deo as Inspector R. D. Wadkar
- Sonia Sahni as Kamini
- Jankidas as Jankidas
- Surendra as Ajit and Himmat's Step-father
- Deven Verma as Delivery Van Driver

== Music ==
The film's songs were composed by Sapan Chakraborty and the lyrics were written by Sahir Ludhianvi.

Song	Singer
"Chup Ho Aaj, Kaho Kya Hai"	Kishore Kumar
"Jaane Aaj Kya Hua, Aisa Kabhi Hua Na Tha"	Asha Bhosle, Kishore Kumar
"Teen Lok Par Raj Tihara, Char Khut Tora Dham Re"	Asha Bhosle, Mahendra Kapoor
"Yahan Bandhu, Aate Ko Hai Jana"	Mukesh

== See also ==
- List of films featuring home invasions
