= The Clear Horizon =

- Genre: Soap opera
- Created by: Manya Starr
- Written by: Carol Warner Gluck
- Directed by: Hal Cooper; Joseph Behar
- Starring: Ed Kemmer; Phyllis Avery
- Country of origin: United States
- No. of episodes: 254

Production
- Producer: Charles Polachek
- Running time: 30 minutes

Original release
- Network: CBS
- Release: July 11, 1960 – June 15, 1962

The Clear Horizon is an American soap opera which ran on CBS Daytime from July 11, 1960, to March 10, 1961, and February 26 to June 15, 1962. Manya Starr created the program and was its head writer.

== Premise ==
The Clear Horizon (titled The Army Wife in the pre-production phase) revolved around the problems of astronauts and their wives at Cape Canaveral, Florida. In the show's first episode, Roy Selby (Ed Kemmer) was moved from his post in Alaska to The Pentagon, which gave him a new commission in Florida. Selby and his wife Anne (Phyllis Avery) tried adjusting to their new lives, with Anne feeling attraction to another man. Along with the show's unique theme, it was one of the first daytime dramas to be broadcast from California (CBS Television City in Los Angeles) and one of the first such programs to shoot location footage.

== Cast ==
Kemmer and Avery were co-stars; the rest of the original cast were supporting players.

- Ed Kemmer - Roy Selby
- Phyllis Avery - Anne Selby
- Jimmy Carter - Rickey Selby, Roy and Anne's 10-year-old son.
- Rusty Lane - Harry Moseby, Roy's former sergeant and godfather to Rickey Selby.
- Eve McVeagh - Frances Moseby, Harry's unhappy second wife.
- Denise Alexander - Lois Adams, daughter of Roy's commanding officer.
- Craig Curtis - Greg Selby, Roy's younger brother, also in the army.
- Robert Sorrells - Tobias Windy, Greg's hillbilly army buddy.
- James Edwards - Corporal Davis, who hopes to become an officer.
- William Roerick - Col. Adams, Roy's commanding officer and father to Lois.
- Nan Peterson - PFC Mary Kovac
- Michael Fox - Lt. Sig Levy, a neighbor of the Selbys.
- Gerry Gaylor - Jeanette Levy, Sig's Parisian wife.
- Ted Knight - Col. Tate, a rival of Col. Adams.
- Robert Riordan - Mr. Merganthal, electronics company VP.
- Bill Allen - Lt. Frank Dunning
- Bern Bennett was the show's announcer.

Notable later cast members included Beau Bridges, Lee Meriwether, and Jan Shepard.

== Production ==
The Clear Horizon originated from Hollywood. The background shown over the title and closing sequences was the sun setting over the Pacific Ocean, accompanied by a piano theme by Kip Walton and a voiceover entailing future programs.

== Ratings ==
The Clear Horizon, which was presented live in its initial run was cancelled in March 1961. It returned to the airwaves in February 1962, and was then taped instead of being presented live. This time, the show focused on Anne dealing with life on her own and Roy being trapped behind enemy lines. There was also more emphasis on the characters of Sgt. Harry Moseby and his wife Frances in the second season.

Veteran soap opera writer and creator Irving Vendig (radio's Perry Mason, Search for Tomorrow, The Edge of Night) was a writer of the show following its return.

The Clear Horizon was never a big hit with the viewing audience as a whole, even in the 1960–1961 season. The low ratings of the show - its 1961-1962 ratings were 3.5, putting it at the bottom of the daytime ratings list - ensured its permanent cancellation in June 1962, at which point Anne and Roy would be reunited.
