= Crime with Father =

- Starring: Rusty Lane
- Country of origin: United States
- Original language: English

Production
- Producer: Wilbur Stark
- Running time: 30 minutes

Original release
- Network: ABC
- Release: August 31, 1951 – January 18, 1952

Crime with Father is an early American police drama that aired on ABC on Friday nights from August 31, 1951, to January 18, 1952.

== Plot ==
The series centered on Captain Jim Riland of the homicide squad, and his daughter Chris, who "had a knack for crime-solving" and often helped him solve cases when the police were stymied.

== Personnel ==
Rusty Lane portrayed Captain Jim Riland, and Peggy Lobin played Chris Riland. The writer was Larry Menkin, the producer was Wilbur Stark, and the director was Charles S. Dubin.

== Production ==
According to columnist Terry Vernon, the show was filmed on actual streets without using stock clips or background projections, and showed the home life of the Rilands.

== Reception ==
A review in the trade publication Billboard said that the father-daughter crime solvers premise "has the making of a solid mystery-team trend", but the episode critiqued "was marred by trite scripting and melodramatic thesping". The New York Times review of the first episode said it was "...an obviously low-budgeted series, has a far better than average quality of production, even if the pistol shots still sound like cap pistols".

== Broadcast history ==
The premier episode was broadcast on August 31, 1951 for the eastern United States, but its start was delayed two weeks on the West Coast.

For its first three weeks, the program was sustaining. Thereafter, Block Drug Company became the sponsor, advertising Ammident, Minipoo shampoo, Pycope brushes, and other products. Block's sponsorship ended in early November 1951.

== Episodes ==
No. overall	No. in season	Title	Directed by	Written by	Original release date
1	1	"Premiere"	Charles S. Dubin	Larry Menkin	August 31, 1951
A friend of Chris has mental issues and confesses to murder. Cast:
1	2	"The Baby-Sitter"	Charles S. Dubin	Larry Menkin	September 7, 1951
Cast:
1	3	TBA	Charles S. Dubin	Larry Menkin	September 14, 1951
Cast:
1	4	TBA	Charles S. Dubin	Larry Menkin	September 21, 1951
Cast:
1	5	TBA	Charles S. Dubin	Larry Menkin	September 28, 1951
Cast:
1	6	TBA	Charles S. Dubin	Larry Menkin	October 5, 1951
Cast:
1	7	TBA	Charles S. Dubin	Larry Menkin	October 12, 1951
Cast:
1	8	"The Scissors"	Charles S. Dubin	Larry Menkin	October 19, 1951
Cast:
1	9	"The Trigger Man"	Charles S. Dubin	Larry Menkin	October 26, 1951
Cast:
1	11	TBA	Charles S. Dubin	Larry Menkin	November 9, 1951
Vigilantes cause problems for Capt Riland and Chris. Cast:
1	12	"The Third Brother"	Charles S. Dubin	Larry Menkin	November 16, 1951
The Rilands deal with a close-knit family of criminals. Cast:
1	13	TBA	Charles S. Dubin	Larry Menkin	November 23, 1951
Cast:
1	14	TBA	Charles S. Dubin	Larry Menkin	November 30, 1951
Cast:
1	15	"The Perfect Woman"	Charles S. Dubin	Larry Menkin	December 7, 1951
Cast:
1	16	"The Spree"	Charles S. Dubin	Larry Menkin	December 14, 1951
Cast:
1	17	"Evidence for a Miracle"	Charles S. Dubin	Larry Menkin	December 21, 1951
Cast:
1	18	"K as in Kill"	Charles S. Dubin	Larry Menkin	December 28, 1951
Cast:
1	19	"The Woman Who Hated 1952"	Charles S. Dubin	Larry Menkin	January 4, 1952
Cast:
1	20	"The Storm Thieves"	Charles S. Dubin	Larry Menkin	January 11, 1952
Cast:
1	21	TBA	Charles S. Dubin	Larry Menkin	January 18, 1952
Cast:
