= The Desperate Hours (1955 film) =

1955 film noir directed by William Wyler

- Theatrical poster
- Directed by: William Wyler
- Screenplay by: Joseph Hayes; Jay Dratler (uncredited)
- Based on: 1954 novel The Desperate Hours; 1955 play The Desperate Hours by Joseph Hayes
- Produced by: William Wyler
- Starring: Humphrey Bogart; Fredric March
- Cinematography: Lee Garmes
- Edited by: Robert Swink
- Music by: Gail Kubik; Daniele Amfitheatrof (uncredited)
- Distributed by: Paramount Pictures
- Release date: October 5, 1955
- Running time: 113 minutes
- Language: English
- Budget: $2,388,000 (estimated)
- Box office: $2.5 million (US)

The Desperate Hours is a 1955 film noir starring Humphrey Bogart and Fredric March. It was produced and directed by William Wyler and based on the 1954 novel and 1955 play of the same name, written by Joseph Hayes, which were loosely built on actual events. The film takes place on the Northside of Indianapolis and took great pains to be accurate as to street names and locations within the city and Indiana in general.

The original Broadway production had actor Paul Newman in the Bogart role but he was passed over for the movie because Bogart was a much bigger star. The character of Glenn Griffin was made older in the script so Bogart could play the part. Bogart said he viewed the story as "Duke Mantee grown up." (Note: Bogart originated the role of Mantee on stage in The Petrified Forest, a hit 1935 Broadway play by Robert Sherwood. Bogart played the character – who was based on John Dillinger, whom Bogart resembled – in the 1936 film with the same title.) (Note: The role of Griffin was Bogart's last as a villain.) Spencer Tracy was originally cast as Daniel Hilliard. Although he and Bogart were very good friends, both insisted on top billing, and Tracy eventually withdrew from the picture. (Note: Tracy and Bogart only made one film together, John Ford's Up the River (1930), the first feature film for both actors, and one in which Bogart played a supporting role with Tracy as the star, although their parts were almost of equal size in the film.) Fredric March replaced Tracy.

The Desperate Hours was the first black-and-white film in VistaVision, Paramount's wide-screen process. The house used in the final seasons of the television series Leave It to Beaver was used for exterior shots of the Hilliards' home. In 1956, Joseph Hayes won an Edgar Award from the Mystery Writers of America for Best Motion Picture Screenplay.

== Plot ==
Glenn Griffin is the leader of a trio of escaped convicts who invade a randomly selected suburban home in Indianapolis and hold four members of the Hilliard family, who live in the home, hostage. There they await the arrival of a package, being sent by Griffin's girlfriend, that contains funds to aid the three fugitives in their escape.

Police organize a statewide manhunt for the escapees and eventually discover the distraught family's plight. Griffin menaces and torments the Hilliards and threatens to kill them. A garbage collector, George Patterson, happens upon the situation after noticing Griffin's car in the garage. He is forced to drive into the country, where he is murdered by Sam Kobish, one of the three convicts.

Hal, the third convict and the younger brother of Glenn, is terrified by activities of the police and decides to leave the house and his fellow convicts. Later, while in a phone booth, he shoots a police officer and tries to flee, but is run over by a truck and killed. Subsequently, Kobish is ambushed by police and FBI.

Daniel Hilliard, the family patriarch, convinces law enforcement personnel that their plan to storm the residence is too risky for his family. He then plays a trick on Griffin using an unloaded handgun and forces him out of the house with Griffin's own weapon. Griffin is machine-gunned to death when he hurls the firearm at a police spotlight and makes a break for it.

== Cast ==
- Humphrey Bogart as Glenn Griffin
- Fredric March as Daniel C. Hilliard
- Arthur Kennedy as Deputy Sheriff Jesse Bard
- Martha Scott as Ellie Hilliard
- Dewey Martin as Hal Griffin
- Gig Young as Chuck Wright
- Mary Murphy as Cindy Hilliard
- Richard Eyer as Ralphy Hilliard
- Robert Middleton as Samuel Kobish
- Walter Baldwin as George Patterson
- Whit Bissell as FBI Agent Carson
- Ray Teal as State Police Lieutenant
- Ray Collins as Sheriff Masters
- Simon Oakland as State Trooper (uncredited)
- Burt Mustin as Night Watchman ("Carl") (uncredited)
- Alan Reed as Policeman ("Dutch")
- Joe Flynn as motorist (uncredited)
- Beverly Garland as Miss Swift

== Background ==
Actual events that took place on September 11 and 12 in 1952, wherein the five members of the Hill family were held hostage for 19 hours, inspired the 1954 Joseph Hayes novel which, in turn, inspired the 1955 play on which the movie was based. The Hill family (formerly of Whitemarsh Township, Pennsylvania) sued Time, Inc., because Life magazine published an article in the February 1955 issue about the play, describing it as based on the actual events. The article was illustrated by staged photos with actors in the actual home that was the scene of the events, the Hills having moved away, making efforts to discourage publicity. The Hills' complaint was that the article falsely described the actual events while claiming it represented the truth. Immediately following the home invasion event, Mr. Hill had told the press the family had not been molested or harmed, and in fact had been treated courteously. The Life article, however, stated that some family members had been assaulted, profanity used, and in other ways – according to a New York appellate court – differed from the account Hill had given. Suing in a New York court, the plaintiffs relied on a New York statute which permitted damages suits for violation of the right of privacy only in instances of use of a person's name or picture for commercial purposes without consent. The statute, however, had been interpreted by the New York courts to make the truth of the publication a defense. The defense for Time, Inc., was that the matter was of general interest and the article had been published in good faith. A jury awarded compensatory and punitive damages, but the state appellate court awarded a new trial at which only compensatory damages could be considered, while sustaining liability. This order was affirmed by the highest state court.

Time, Inc., appealed the case to the United States Supreme Court, which ruled that the First Amendment prohibited holding the publisher liable unless the article was known by it to be false, or at least was published with disregard as to its truth or falsity (i.e., recklessly). The jury had not been so instructed, so the judgment could not stand. This ruling was a significant expansion of press protection, for a (qualified) immunity from damages was being extended to publishing matter about people who were newsworthy only by accident, as opposed to, for example, government officials. To this point the relevant cases had only dealt with such so-called "public figures" who were suing publishers. Mr. Hill was represented in the High Court by Richard M. Nixon, at that time an attorney in private practice. The Supreme Court thus made it extremely difficult even for ordinary private persons to prevail in a defamation or "false light" invasion of privacy case. From the Supreme Court, the case was sent back in 1967, to the New York courts for disposition under this newly announced constitutional standard, probably involving a new trial, or perhaps summary judgment rendered on the basis of affidavits and depositions.

== Music ==
The film featured music by Gail Kubik and Daniele Amfitheatrof (who was uncredited).

Songwriters Burt Bacharach and Wilson Stone, who were staff writers for Paramount Pictures at the time, were commissioned by Paramount to write a song for possible inclusion in the film. Their song, also titled "The Desperate Hours", was recorded by Eileen Rodgers and The Ray Conniff Orchestra and released as a single by Columbia records in 1955 (Columbia – 40594). The song is not to be confused with Mel Tormé's "These Desperate Hours", an unrelated song written for a 1960 episode of the television show Dan Raven. The Tormé recording has been erroneously included on anthologies of music by Bacharach and incorrectly identified as a tie-in to the Paramount film.

== Reception ==
On the review aggregator website Rotten Tomatoes, 88% of 8 critics' reviews are positive, with an average rating of 7/10.

== Remakes ==
The movie was remade in 1990 as Desperate Hours, starring Mickey Rourke, Anthony Hopkins, Mimi Rogers, Kelly Lynch, Lindsay Crouse and David Morse. The remake, directed by Michael Cimino, received poor reviews.

The 1994 black comedy film The Ref also features a similar plot, with a criminal on the lam (Denis Leary) taking a couple (Kevin Spacey and Judy Davis) hostage in their own home.

The film was also remade in India as the Hindi film 36 Ghante (1974).

== See also ==
- List of films featuring home invasions
- List of American films of 1955
