= William Redfield (actor) =

American actor (1927–1976)

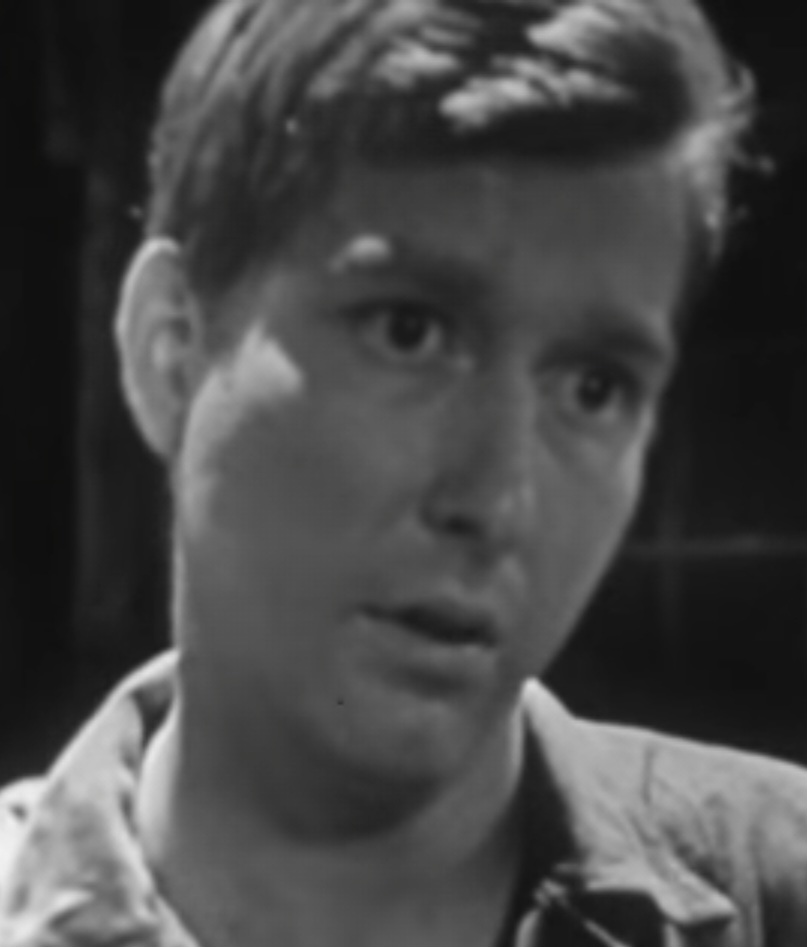
- Redfield in Suspense (1952)
- Born: William Henry Redfield; January 26, 1927; New York City, U.S.
- Died: August 17, 1976 (aged 49); New York City, U.S.
- Resting place: Long Island National Cemetery, Farmingdale, New York
- Occupations: Actor and writer
- Years active: 1939–1976
- Children: 2
- Military career
- Allegiance: United States
- Branch: United States Army
- Rank: TEC5

William Henry Redfield (January 26, 1927 – August 17, 1976) was an American actor and author who appeared in many theatrical, film, radio, and television roles.

== Early years ==
Born in New York City, Redfield was the son of Henry C. Redfield and the former Mareta A. George. His father was a conductor and arranger of music, and his mother was a chorus girl with the Ziegfeld Follies.

== Acting career ==
Redfield began acting when he was 9 years old, appearing in the Broadway production Swing Your Lady (1936). He appeared in the original 1938 Broadway production of Our Town. A founding member of New York's Actors Studio, Redfield's additional theatre credits include A Man for All Seasons, Hamlet, You Know I Can't Hear You When the Water's Running, and Dude. He also sang and danced the role of Mercury in Cole Porter's Out of This World.

Other Broadway credits include Excursion (1937), Virginia (1937), Stop-over (1938), Junior Miss, Snafu, U.S.A., Barefoot Boy With Cheek (1947), Montserrat (1949), Misalliance (1953), Double in Hearts (1956), Midgie Purvis (1961), A Minor Adjustment (1967) and The Love Suicide at Schofield Barracks (1972).

His film credits include Back Door to Heaven (as a child actor), The Connection, Such Good Friends, Fantastic Voyage, Morituri (alongside friend Marlon Brando), A New Leaf and For Pete's Sake. Redfield's best known film appearance was as Dale Harding in One Flew Over the Cuckoo's Nest.

On television, Redfield played the title role in the DuMont series Jimmy Hughes, Rookie Cop (1953), and appeared in The Philco Television Playhouse, Lux Video Theatre, The United States Steel Hour, Studio One, As the World Turns, Alfred Hitchcock Presents, Gunsmoke, Naked City, Maude, Rich Man, Poor Man Book II, Bewitched , and The Bob Newhart Show. His best known TV appearance was as Floyd, the younger brother of Felix Unger (played by Tony Randall), on The Odd Couple.

== Military service ==
During his acting career, Redfield served as an infantryman during World War II, holding the rank of technician fifth grade.

== Author ==
Redfield was a columnist for Playfare Magazine and collaborated with Wally Cox on Mr. Peepers, a book about the television character with that name.

Most significantly, he authored Letters From An Actor, first copyrighted in 1966. It consists of letters written to his friend, Robert Mills, between January and August of 1964 and chronicles the rehearsals and performances of Hamlet. This production was conceived and directed by Sir John Gielgud as a modern-dress "rehearsal" of the play. Hamlet was played by Richard Burton; during rehearsals in Toronto he and Elizabeth Taylor were married for the first time. Redfield, cast as Guildenstern, witnesses the enormous difficulty of both acting in and directing Hamlet while also trying to manage celebrity and notoriety.

This classic book of the theater was out of print for several decades, until a new edition was published in March 2024 in response to a production of The Motive and the Cue, a play by Jack Thorne. The play is based in part on Redfield's history of the Gielgud-Burton production of Hamlet. Sam Mendes, who directed The Motive and The Cue, wrote the foreword to the new edition of Letters From An Actor.

== Death ==
During the filming of One Flew Over the Cuckoo's Nest, Redfield was diagnosed with leukemia, after a doctor on set had noticed he was exhibiting symptoms of the disease. Redfield died at Saint Clare's Hospital on August 17, 1976, at the age of 49, with the cause of death given as "a respiratory ailment complicated by leukemia." With his wife, he had a son and a daughter. Redfield is buried at Long Island National Cemetery in Farmingdale, New York.

== Filmography ==
Year	Title	Role	Notes
1939	Back Door to Heaven	Charley Smith	
1955	Conquest of Space	Roy Cooper	
1956	The Proud and Profane	Chaplain Lieutenant (junior grade) Holmes	
1957	Alfred Hitchcock Presents	Stephen Fontaine	Season 2 Episode 18: "The Manacled"
1958	Alfred Hitchcock Presents	Richard	Season 3 Episode 17: "The Motive"
1958	I Married a Woman	Eddie Benson - Elevator Operator	
1958	Colgate Theatre	Dr. Roger Boone	Season 1 Episode 1: "Adventures of a Model"
1961	Gunsmoke	Joe Lime	Season 6 Episode 18: “Unloaded Gun"
1961	The Connection	Jim Dunn	
1961	Alfred Hitchcock Presents	Fred Logan	Season 6 Episode 18: "The Greatest Monster of Them All"
1961	The Connection	Jim Dunn	
1964	Hamlet	Guildenstern	
1964	Pão de Açúcar	Gary Wills	
1965	Morituri	Baldwin	
1966	Duel at Diablo	Sergeant Ferguson	
1966	Fantastic Voyage	Captain Bill Owens	
1967	All Woman	Tod	
1971	Pigeons	Jonathan's Father	
1971	A New Leaf	Beckett	
1971	Such Good Friends	Barney	
1972	The Hot Rock	Lieutenant Hoover	
1974	For Pete's Sake	Fred Robbins	
1974	Death Wish	Sam Kreutzer	
1975	One Flew Over the Cuckoo's Nest	Dale Harding	
1975	Fear on Trial	Stan Hopp	Television film
1977	Mr. Billion	Leopold Lacy	Final film role; premiered after his death

== Radio appearances ==
Year	Program	Episode/source
1952	Grand Central Station	It Makes a Difference
1955-57	X Minus One	Numerous episodes
Dec. 10, 1961	Suspense	And So To Sleep My Love
1974-76	CBS Radio Mystery Theater	80 episodes
