= Jimmy Hughes, Rookie Cop =

American TV crime series (1953)

- Genre: Crime
- Written by: Bruce Geller
- Starring: William Redfield; Rusty Lane; Wendy Drew; Conrad Janis
- Country of origin: United States
- Original language: English

Production
- Running time: 24 mins.

Original release
- Network: DuMont
- Release: May 8 – July 3, 1953

Jimmy Hughes, Rookie Cop is an American crime show that aired on the DuMont Television Network from May 8, 1953, to July 3, 1953.

== Premise ==
Jimmy Hughes (William Redfield) returns from the Korean War when his policeman father is killed by criminals. Inspector Ferguson (Rusty Lane) becomes his mentor when Jimmy joins the police to find his father's killers. Betty Hughes (Wendy Drew), Jimmy's sister, was the only other regular character. In later episodes, Conrad Janis took over the title role.

As the series progressed, Hughes moved beyond seeking his father's killer to work on cases that involved topics such as kidnapping, narcotics, and teenage gangs.

== Production ==
Barry Shear was the producer of Jimmy Hughes, Rookie Cop. The series was written by Bruce Geller, later famous as the creator of the TV series Mission: Impossible.

== Reception ==
Columnist C. E. Butterfield of The Evening Star expressed disappointment that the DuMont Network had dropped Dark of Night "in favor of a who-dun-it" whose "opening performance seemed amateurish".

== Broadcast history ==
Jimmy Hughes, Rookie Cop was originally announced as debuting on Monday, April 27, 1953. However, it actually premiered on Friday, May 8, 1953 at 8:30 pm EDT on the DuMont network.

Only nine episodes were broadcast, ending with July 3, 1953, though The Daily Record of Long Branch, New Jersey continued listing it through July 17, 1953. Other newspapers, however, showed Guide Right moved to the Friday 8:30 pm time slot on DuMont stations.

=== Episode status ===
Only one episode of the series survives, the network premiere on May 8, 1953, which is held at the UCLA Film and Television Archive.

=== Episodes ===
| No. overall | No. in season | Title | Directed by | Written by | Original release date |
|---|---|---|---|---|---|
| 1 | 1 | TBA | Barry Shear | William C. Crane and Bob Corcoran | May 8, 1953 |
Cast: Ed Peck, Don Hamner, Bernard Kates, Paul Andor
| 2 | 2 | TBA | Unknown | Unknown | May 15, 1953 |
Cast:
| 3 | 3 | TBA | Unknown | Unknown | May 22, 1953 |
Cast:
| 4 | 4 | TBA | Unknown | Unknown | May 29, 1953 |
Cast:
| 5 | 5 | TBA | Unknown | Unknown | June 5, 1953 |
Cast:
| 6 | 6 | TBA | Unknown | Unknown | June 12, 1953 |
Cast:
| 7 | 7 | TBA | Unknown | Unknown | June 19, 1953 |
Cast:
| 8 | 8 | TBA | Unknown | Unknown | June 26, 1953 |
Hughes suspects a kidnapping is fake. Cast:
| 9 | 9 | TBA | Unknown | Unknown | July 3, 1953 |
Cast:

== See also ==
- List of programs broadcast by the DuMont Television Network
- List of surviving DuMont Television Network broadcasts

== Bibliography ==
- David Weinstein, The Forgotten Network: DuMont and the Birth of American Television (Philadelphia: Temple University Press, 2004) ISBN 1-59213-245-6
- Alex McNeil, Total Television, Fourth edition (New York: Penguin Books, 1980) ISBN 0-14-024916-8
- Tim Brooks and Earle Marsh, The Complete Directory to Prime Time Network and Cable TV Shows 1946–Present, Ninth edition (New York: Ballantine Books, 2007) ISBN 978-0-345-49773-4
