= The Desperate Hours (1967 film) =

- Based on: The Desperate Hours by Joseph Hayes
- Written by: Clive Exton
- Directed by: Ted Kotcheff
- Country of origin: United States
- Original language: English

Production
- Executive producer: David Susskind
- Producer: Daniel Melnick

Original release
- Release: 1967

The Desperate Hours is a 1967 TV film. It was an adaptation of the 1954 novel The Desperate Hours.

== Cast ==
- George Segal as Glenn Griffin
- Arthur Hill as Dan Hilliard
- Michael Conrad as Sam Robish
- Mart Hulswit as Graham Jarvis
- Michael Kearney as Ralphie Hilliard
- Yvette Mimieux as Cindy Hilliard
- Barry Primus as Hank Griffin
- Dolph Sweet as Jesse Bard
- Ralph Waite as Lt. Fredericks
- Teresa Wright as Eleanor Hilliard

== Production ==
The film was originally going to star George Segal and Robert Stack. Stack then read the script, was unhappy his role – that of the father – had been changed into a "psychopathic heavy" and pulled out, saying it "wasn't the same story" as the novel and play.

== Reception ==
One reviewer thought the leads were miscast.
