= United States v. Morgan (1953) =

- Court: United States District Court for the Southern District of New York
- Full case name: United States v. Morgan et al.
- Decided: October 14, 1953
- Defendant: 17 defendants (see list in article)
- Plaintiff: United States of America
- Citation: 118 F. Supp. 621 (S.D.N.Y. 1953)

Court membership
- Judge sitting: Harold Medina

Keywords
- Investment Bankers Case

United States v. Morgan, 118 F. Supp. 621 (S.D.N.Y. 1953), more commonly referred to as the Investment Bankers Case was a multi-year antitrust case brought by the United States Justice Department against seventeen of the most prominent Wall Street investment banking firms, known as the Wall Street Seventeen. The Justice Department filed suit against the firms in 1947, claiming that the leading investment banking firms had combined, conspired and agreed, in violation of the Sherman Antitrust Act, to control and monopolize the U.S. Securities markets.

== Wall Street Seventeen defendants ==
The 17 Wall Street firms named as defendants in the case, later known as the "Wall Street Seventeen" were:

1. Morgan Stanley & Co.
2. Kidder Peabody
3. Goldman Sachs
4. White Weld & Co.
5. Dillon Read & Co.
6. Drexel & Co.
7. First Boston Corporation
8. Smith Barney & Co.
9. Kuhn, Loeb & Co.
10. Lehman Brothers
11. Blyth & Co.
12. Eastman Dillon & Co.
13. Harriman Ripley
14. Stone & Webster Securities Corp.
15. Harris, Hall & Co.
16. Glore, Forgan & Co.
17. Union Securities Corp.

Excluded from the case were other prominent Wall Street firms including Bache & Co., Halsey Stuart & Co., Merrill Lynch, Pierce, Fenner & Beane and Salomon Brothers & Hutzler.

== Judgment ==
The case, which was brought to trial in the Southern District of New York in 1952, was presided over by the controversial and politically conservative Federal judge Harold Medina, who had become internationally infamous for his rulings in the 1949 Smith Act trials of Communist Party leaders. In October 1953, after a year-long trial, Medina found in favor of the investment banking firms. In his judgment, he saw "a constantly changing panorama of competition among the seventeen defendant firms."

== See also ==
- Pujo Committee
- Pecora Commission
