= Sara Lane (actress) =

American actress (1949–2023)

- Lane in The Virginian, 1968
- Born: Susan Russell Lane; March 12, 1949; New York City, U.S.
- Died: March 3, 2023 (aged 73); Napa, California, U.S.
- Occupation: Actress
- Notable work: The Virginian; I Saw What You Did
- Father: Rusty Lane

Sara Lane (born Susan Russell Lane; March 12, 1949 – March 3, 2023) was an American actress.

== Early life and education ==
Lane was born in New York City on March 12, 1949, the daughter of actors Rusty Lane and Sara Anderson. She had a younger brother and a younger sister.

When Lane was a baby, she appeared in a television commercial for soap and in an educational film. At age 12, she was in a vitamin commercial. She and her family moved to California when Lane was 12 years old. She attended Santa Monica High School in Santa Monica. Money was Lane's motivation for becoming an actress. She said, "I didn't want to act but I needed money for making clothes, making jewelry, and raising quarter horses." As a teenager, Lane made earrings for herself from broken jewelry, and she and her mother made almost all of her clothes.

== Career ==
In 1964, producer William Castle saw Lane's picture in a newspaper in connection with a Miss Los Angeles Teenage beauty contest. After making screen tests, she was signed for a part in the film I Saw What You Did.

In 1966, executive producer Frank Price signed Lane to portray Elizabeth Grainger on The Virginian. Being the owner of two horses, Lane was an experienced horsewoman and did her own riding scenes on the show except when the producer insisted on use of a double.

== Personal life and death ==
Lane died from breast cancer at her home in Napa, California, on March 3, 2023, aged 73. She was survived by her husband, Jon Scott, as well as her daughter, son, granddaughter, and sister.
