= Patricia Peardon =

American actress

Patricia Peardon (1923 or 1924 – April 22, 1993) was an American actress who originated the title role in the Broadway play Junior Miss. She later became a sculptor.

== Early years ==
Born in Paterson, New Jersey, Peardon was the daughter of U. S. Navy Commander R. C. Peardon and his wife. Her father was a baritone soloist in his church, and he performed in locally produced operas and operettas. Her mother was a business executive who wanted Peardon to become a teacher. She grew up in Allendale, New Jersey, and became an actress when she was 8 years old. She attended Oakley Hall private girls' school in Allendale.

Radio programs on which Peardon appeared in her youth included The March of Time (with her roles including Princess Elizabeth, Snow White, and Stalin's daughter) and Cavalcade of America. Raised in Midland Park, New Jersey, and then nearby Ridgewood, Peardon was 12 years old when she toured with Katharine Hepburn in Jane Eyre, a production of the Theatre Guild. Peardon later cited Hepburn's encouragement as a significant factor in her becoming an actress.

== Career ==
=== Acting ===
Peardon's Broadway debut came when she was 17 years old as she created the role of Judy Graves in Junior Miss (1941). She was 16 when, at the prompting of a friend, she "put on high heels and all the jewelry she could muster, piled her hair on top of her head and shadowed her eyelids" and went to Moss Hart seeking the part. A review in Time magazine said that Peardon "tears into the role of Judy with engaging gusto." Jay Carmody wrote in a review in the Evening Star, "The respect in which the play is most singularly blessed is in having Miss Peardon to play the role of Judy." Theater critic Richard Watts described Peardon as "just gawky enough, just blooming enough, and just pretty enough" for her part. Peardon played Graves for the show's full Broadway run and a subsequent long tour. She also did so overseas when Junior Miss was the first USO-sponsored play to tour Europe. The role led to her being featured on the cover of the December 15, 1941, issue of Life magazine and in an accompanying story with photographs of a re-enactment of her meeting Hart at the theater.

Also on Broadway, Peardon portrayed Cindy Hillard in The Desperate Hours (1955). That role resulted from her attending an audition for Robert Montgomery's television program. Montgomery, who also was directing The Desperate Hours, asked her to skip the TV audition and try out for the play instead. In other stage activity, Peardon toured with Arnold Moss's Shakespeare Festival Players, performing in King Lear, Love's Labour's Lost, Measure for Measure, The Tempest, and Twelfth Night. She also performed at the American Shakespeare Theatre at Stratford, Connecticut in 1964 and toured in a summer production of Heaven Can Wait. Plays in which she performed in regional theater included Uncle Vanya, Cat on a Hot Tin Roof, Dark of the Moon, The Music Master, and The Seven Year Itch.

Peardon was heard on radio on The Aldrich Family, Let's Pretend, and Orphans of Divorce. She acted on television on Johnny Jupiter and on The Philco Television Playhouse.

=== Literary recitals ===
The Library of Congress commissioned Peardon to create a commemorative program for the 100th anniversary of Little Women in 1968. The result was a one-woman show, The Amazing Miss Alcott. Peardon compiled material from letters and journals to form a narrative about Louisa May Alcott and her "problems of supporting a family, including an impractical, scholarly father in a day of non-freedom for women." Peardon presented the program on television and in person at colleges and at club meetings. She also performed two other recital programs: The Queen's Confession (an adaptation of a novel about Marie Antoinette by Victoria Holt) and An Acquaintance of Angels.

=== Sculpting ===
After painting for much of her life, Peardon started sculpting in 1965. Her technique was to mold figures in wax, after which she cast the works in bronze. She typically created "tiny people always in an outdoor setting." She began exhibiting and selling cast bronze sculptures in 1966. Tiffany & Co. displayed her works in the store's windows three times. Her sculptures were also exhibited at Avery Fisher Hall, the Metropolitan Opera House, Tufts University, and Burgos Galleries. In 1968, her works at the Chelsea National Bank Gallery were priced from $1,100 to $10,500.

=== Public service ===
Peardon chaired the junior committee for two benefit performances of Gratefully Yours in 1942. Children of British actors and actresses who had come to the United States because of World War II formed the cast of the production. Proceeds were split between the American Theatre Wing War Service and the British and American Ambulance Corps. She was chair of the Junior Committee for Naval Relief during World War II. Her duties included overseeing 50 assistants in selling tickets and organizing efforts for an all-star show at Madison Square Garden on March 10, 1942.

== Personal life and death ==
Peardon married writer Murray Kalischer on April 21, 1942, in New York City. She was also married to writer Peter Brandt Harmon and to producer Richard Horner. Each marriage ended in divorce. She had two daughters. She died of pneumonia on April 22, 1993, in St. Luke's Hospital in Manhattan, aged 69.
