= Harold Medina =

American judge (1888–1990)

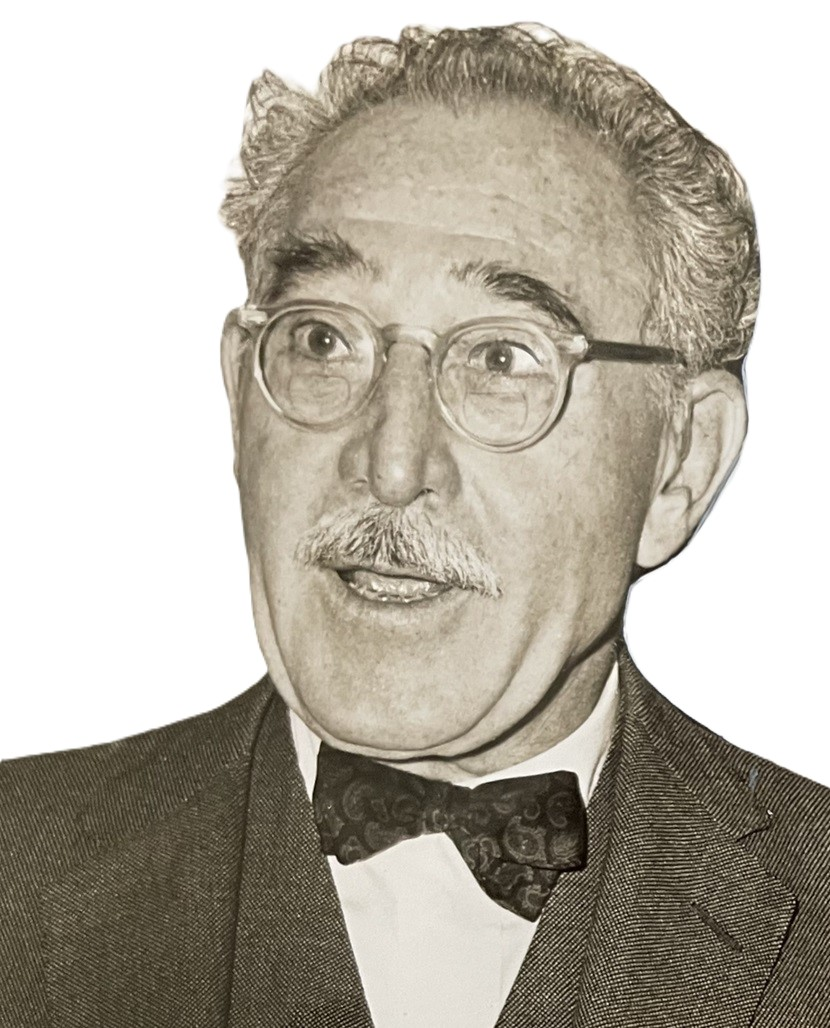
- Medina in 1963

Senior Judge of the United States Court of Appeals for the Second Circuit
- In office March 1, 1958 – February 22, 1980

Judge of the United States Court of Appeals for the Second Circuit
- In office June 23, 1951 – March 1, 1958
- Appointed by: Harry S. Truman
- Preceded by: Learned Hand
- Succeeded by: Henry Friendly

Judge of the United States District Court for the Southern District of New York
- In office June 20, 1947 – June 23, 1951
- Appointed by: Harry S. Truman
- Preceded by: Samuel Mandelbaum
- Succeeded by: Thomas Francis Murphy

Personal details
- Born: Harold Raymond Medina; February 16, 1888 Brooklyn, New York, U.S.
- Died: March 14, 1990 (aged 102) Westwood, New Jersey, U.S.
- Children: Harold Medina Jr.
- Education: Princeton University (AB); Columbia University (LLB)

Harold Raymond Medina (February 16, 1888 – March 14, 1990) was a United States circuit judge of the United States Court of Appeals for the Second Circuit and previously was a United States district judge of the United States District Court for the Southern District of New York.

Medina is perhaps most well-remembered for presiding over the Smith Act trials of Communist Party leaders in 1949.

== Early life and career ==
Medina was born in Brooklyn, New York, to Joaquin Adolfo Medina and Elizabeth Fash Medina. His father was a naturalized United States citizen from Mérida, Yucatán, Mexico, and his mother from New York City of Dutch ancestry. Medina graduated from Holbrook Military Academy in Ossining, New York in 1905. Medina received an Artium Baccalaureus degree Phi Beta Kappa from Princeton University in 1909. He received a Bachelor of Laws from Columbia Law School in 1912, graduating co-head of his class. He was in private practice of law in New York City from 1912 to 1947. He was a founder and lecturer for the Medina Bar Review Course in New York City from 1912 to 1942. He was an associate professor at Columbia Law School from 1915 to 1940.

== Federal judicial service ==
Medina was nominated by President Harry S. Truman on May 15, 1947, to a seat on the United States District Court for the Southern District of New York vacated by Judge Samuel Mandelbaum. He was confirmed by the United States Senate on June 18, 1947, and received his commission on June 20, 1947. His service was terminated on June 23, 1951, due to his elevation to the Second Circuit.

Medina was nominated by President Truman on June 11, 1951, to a seat on the United States Court of Appeals for the Second Circuit vacated by Judge Learned Hand. He was confirmed by the Senate on June 21, 1951, and received his commission on June 23, 1951. He assumed senior status on March 1, 1958. His service was terminated on February 22, 1980, due to his retirement.

=== Notable cases ===
In 1949, Medina presided over the trial of 11 leaders of the United States Communist Party charged with advocating the violent overthrow of the government. This was known as Foley Square trial. In this case, the jury found all the defendants guilty, and Medina sentenced most of them to five years in prison. He also gave prison sentences to five of the defense attorneys on charges of contempt of court; among them was George William Crockett Jr., who later became a Member of Congress.

Medina was the trial judge for the Dennis v. United States case that reached the federal supreme court.

Medina presided over the year-long Investment Bankers Case in 1951-1952, an antitrust case against 17 of the most prominent Wall Street investment banking firms, known as the Wall Street Seventeen. He ruled in favor of the investment banks.

== Death ==
Medina died on March 14, 1990, at Pascack Valley Hospital in Westwood, New Jersey, at 102 years of age, after residing at a nursing home in that city his last several years.

== Honors ==
Medina was featured on the cover of Time in its October 24, 1949 edition.

In 1957, Medina received an honorary Doctor of Laws degree from Elizabethtown College located in Elizabethtown, Lancaster County, Pennsylvania.

J. Woodford Howard Jr., professor of political science emeritus at Johns Hopkins University, along with Professor Patrick Schmidt of Macalester College and Professor David Yalof of the University of Connecticut, are currently completing an authorized biography of Medina.

The Harold R. Medina Professorship of Procedural Jurisprudence at Columbia University School of Law is named in Judge Medina's honor.

== See also ==
- List of Hispanic and Latino American jurists
- Harold Medina Jr.
- Foley Square trial
- Investment Bankers Case

== External sources ==
- Harold R. Medina Papers at Seeley G. Mudd Manuscript Library, Princeton University
- Princeton University: Video Recording: Medina Speaks at kickoff of $53 Million fundraising campaign on October 1, 1959

Legal offices
Preceded by Samuel Mandelbaum	Judge of the United States District Court for the Southern District of New York; 1947–1951	Succeeded by Thomas Francis Murphy
Preceded by Learned Hand	Judge of the United States Court of Appeals for the Second Circuit; 1951–1958	Succeeded by Henry Friendly
