= Desperate Hours =

1990 film by Michael Cimino

- Directed by: Michael Cimino
- Screenplay by: Lawrence Konner; Mark Rosenthal; Joseph Hayes; Michael Cimino
- Based on: The Desperate Hours by Joseph Hayes
- Produced by: Michael Cimino; Dino De Laurentiis
- Starring: Mickey Rourke; Anthony Hopkins; Mimi Rogers; Lindsay Crouse; Kelly Lynch; Elias Koteas
- Cinematography: Doug Milsome
- Edited by: Christopher Rouse
- Music by: David Mansfield
- Production companies: Dino De Laurentiis Communications; Cannon Films; Film and Television Company
- Distributed by: MGM/UA Distribution Co.
- Release date: October 5, 1990
- Running time: 106 minutes
- Language: English
- Budget: $18 million or $20 million
- Box office: $2.7 million (US)

Desperate Hours is a 1990 American neo-noir action thriller film directed by Michael Cimino. It is a remake of the 1955 film of the same name and an adaptation the 1954 novel by Joseph Hayes, who also co-wrote the script with Cimino based on a treatment by Lawrence Konner and Mark Rosenthal. Cimino was not credited as writer on the finished product. The film stars Mickey Rourke and Anthony Hopkins, with Mimi Rogers, Kelly Lynch, Lindsay Crouse and Elias Koteas in supporting roles. It marks Cimino's third collaboration with Rourke, having previously worked with him on the films Heaven's Gate and Year of the Dragon.

== Plot ==
In Utah, Nancy Breyers is a defense lawyer who is inexplicably in love with client Michael Bosworth, an intelligent and sociopathic convict. During a break from a courtroom hearing, Nancy sneaks a gun to Bosworth. After Bosworth snaps a guard's neck, Bosworth and Nancy slip away. Bosworth tears at Nancy's clothing and leaves her behind, where she will tell authorities Bosworth held her at gunpoint during his escape. He speeds off in a car with his brother Wally, and their partner, the hulking, half-witted Albert, then changes cars with one Nancy has left for him in a remote location.

In the meantime, decorated Vietnam veteran Tim Cornell arrives at his former home with his ex-wife Nora, who has two kids, 15-year-old May and her 8-year-old brother Zack. Tim and Nora separated due to his infidelity with Karen, a younger woman, and Tim shows up trying to reconcile with Nora, with whom he is still in love.

Needing a hideout until Nancy can catch up with them, the Bosworth brothers and Albert settle on the Cornells' home with a "For Sale" sign which is seemingly picked by Bosworth at random. Bosworth picks up intimate details of the Cornells, and one by one all of them find themselves the prisoners of the Bosworth brothers and Albert. Nancy's innocent act does not fool FBI agent Brenda Chandler, who puts surveillance on her every move. Nancy eventually cuts a deal with Chandler to have charges against her reduced by betraying Bosworth.

As young Zack tries to escape through a window, their real estate agent Ed Tallent, who has come to discuss the closing, meets him. Bosworth makes Ed enter the house by force, and as they talk, Bosworth shoots him, then makes Albert dispose of the body as Albert gets anxiety-ridden and decides to go off on his own. As Albert leaves while covered in blood, he intercepts two college girls, who expose his presence to a small gas station owner. The owner calls the authorities who chase after Albert. Albert ignores their order to surrender and is killed by the police on a river bank.

Nancy begs Chandler to give her a gun, but unbeknownst to Nancy, Chandler removes the bullets. As she goes to the Cornells' house, the house gets surrounded, and as a shootout starts by Bosworth, Wally is fatally wounded in a barrage of FBI bullets and falls on top of a shocked Nancy. Wally's gun is taken away by Tim. Bosworth holds a gun on Nora and is prepared to use it if Tim interferes. He is unaware that Tim has removed the bullets. Tim then drags the criminal outside, where Bosworth ignores the FBI's order to surrender, and is fatally shot.

== Cast ==
- Mickey Rourke as Michael Bosworth
- Anthony Hopkins as Tim Cornell
- Mimi Rogers as Nora Cornell
- Kelly Lynch as Nancy Breyers
- Lindsay Crouse as Brenda Chandler
- John Finn as Lexington
- Peter Crombie as Connelly
- Elias Koteas as Wally Bosworth
- David Morse as Albert
- Shawnee Smith as May Cornell
- Danny Gerard as Zack Cornell
- Matt McGrath as Kyle
- Gerry Bamman as Ed Tallent
- Ellen McElduff as Bank Teller

== Production ==
The project began at Paramount with Dino De Laurentiis attached as producer and Lawrence Konner and Mark Rosenthal assigned to write the script. The film then moved to TriStar under Jeff Sagansky, with Christopher Cain to direct and Mickey Rourke to star. Cain left the project and was replaced by William Friedkin. Eventually Friedkin decided to make The Guardian and Rourke asked Michael Cimino to direct. Konner and Rosenthal left the project and Cimino wrote his own script.

Filming took place from October to December 1989. Parts of the film were shot in Salt Lake City, Echo Junction, Orem, Zion, and Capitol Reef in Utah. The movie marked De Laurentiis' return to production after his 1988 bankruptcy. According to some official sources, director Cimino's original two and a half-hour cut of Desperate Hours was mutilated by the film's producers, resulting in a very badly edited film filled with plot holes. The only known proof of any deleted scenes are some stills which seemingly show just a few of them.

One major scene—approximately eight minutes in length—which is not in the finished film, was shot at Brigham Young University's empty football field in Provo, Utah, and involved an outdoors confrontation between FBI agent Brenda Chandler (played by Lindsay Crouse) and Nancy Breyers (played by Kelly Lynch). It was allegedly cut because test audiences "read lesbian overtones" into their relationship. John Pym described such a scene in a profile for Cimino for Sight and Sound:

Desperate Hours is minus one key scene—his other favourite moment in the movie—but on this occasion he is hopeful of having it restored. "The French find out right away if there's a scene missing from a movie, they're like detectives, and I think they've already asked for this one to be put back in. It was in my opinion the best scene I've ever directed. It's a four-minute scene, in one shot; there are no tricks, no cuts, it's pure performance."

The scene comes in the middle of the film, where at present there seems a slight ellipse. The agent Lindsay Crouse attempts to 'turn' Kelly Lynch by revealing that she herself was once attracted to a violent man. "She's telling the truth, using her life on Kelly, like an actress, so it's a diabolical scene, really. We made several quite good takes, but they were missing that really high note. Just as I'd done with Christopher Walken in Deer Hunter, when without warning he spat in De Niro's face, I took Lindsay aside and told her just before the shot to take Kelly's face in her hands and kiss her with all the passion and compassion she could manage." Cimino achieved the desired effect. "When I said, 'Cut', everybody whooped, they knew we'd hit that high c above c."

Cimino later embellished on how he directed Crouse and Lynch:

They finished the take, I went and I kissed them both; I said, "God, what a brilliant, amazing scene!" So I look Lindsay aside—who's the more serious actress—and I told her, "I need one more take [...] When you hear me say 'Roll camera', I want you to take Kelly, Kelly's face in your hand, I want you to bring her face to you and I want you to just come down to her mouth and give her the most passionate kiss you've ever given anybody in your life." She says, "Okay." And Kelly didn't know what was coming! So, the two girls are ready. Now, just as we start this last take, these big, fat white snowflakes start coming down. It was like a miracle... [These] white mountains, and these big, fat snowflakes would just stick like flowers, like snow flowers, on their hair and their wardrobe. And, so, I said "Roll camera" and Lindsay took Kelly's face and she kissed her so passionate. Kelly... she was immobilized, she was in such shock, you know. And, in that moment, I [whispered] "Action!", and Lindsay starts to speak. And, the result was just mind-blowing! I mean, the whole crew was standing one feet [sic] off the ground. We could... we knew that was the moment of transcendence, we knew we had achieved something, and God is giving us these snow flowers, you know."

== Reception ==
The film was a commercial disappointment and received poor reviews. Critic and movie historian Leonard Maltin referred to the film as "ludicrous... with no suspense, an at-times-laughable music score, and Shawnee Smith as a daughter/victim you'll beg to see cold-cocked." The film holds a 29% "rotten" rating on the reviews aggregation site Rotten Tomatoes based on 14 reviews. Metacritic, which uses a weighted average, assigned the film a score of 33 out of 100, based on 16 critics, indicating "generally unfavorable" reviews. Audiences polled by CinemaScore gave the film an average grade of "C+" on an A+ to F scale.

Christopher Tookey, reviewing the film for the Sunday Telegraph called Desperate Hours "one of those films which should never have been released, even on parole - a danger to itself." Mickey Rourke was nominated for the Golden Raspberry Award for Worst Actor for his performance in the film (also for Wild Orchid), but lost to Andrew Dice Clay for The Adventures of Ford Fairlane at the 11th Golden Raspberry Awards. Siskel and Ebert included it on their "Worst of 1990" special, with Roger Ebert calling it an "overwrought melodrama".

== See also ==
- List of films featuring home invasions
