= Grand Central Station (radio series) =

- Genre: Light dramatic anthology
- Running time: 30 minutes
- Country of origin: United States
- Language(s): English
- Syndicates: Blue Network; CBS; NBC; ABC
- Produced by: Himan Brown; Martin Horrell
- Original release: October 8, 1937 – April 2, 1954
- Sponsored by: Listerine; Rinso; Pillsbury; Cream of Wheat; Toni

Grand Central Station was an American anthology radio series that had a long run on the major networks from 1937 to 1954. Produced by Himan Brown, Martin Horrell and others, the story content ranged from romantic comedies to lightweight dramas. The program debuted on September 28, 1937, on NBC.

Each program opened with an announcer intoning that Grand Central was "the crossroads of a million private lives, a gigantic stage on which are played a thousand dramas daily." Actors included Jim Ameche and Hume Cronyn. The announcers were George Baxter, Ken Roberts and Tom Shirley. The programs were narrated by Jack Arthur, Stuart Metz and Alexander Scourby. When some listeners noted that steam engines, the sounds of which were heard during the broadcasts, no longer frequented the terminal, Brown responded: "You have your own Grand Central Station."

In 1952 a half-hour television pilot was created but was not picked up. The episode starred Mercedes McCambridge, with supporting roles by Kirby Grant and Parley Baer. It was produced by Don W. Sharpe, who copyrighted the film. It began with a montage of trains chugging into Manhattan and the same words that had opened the radio program.

The show's title was factually erroneous; Grand Central is actually a terminal, not a station. Brown claimed that the New York Central Railroad would not allow him to use the actual name.
