= The Desperate Hours (Hayes novel) =

American thriller novel

- First edition cover
- Author: Joseph Hayes
- Genre: Thriller
- Publisher: Random House
- Publication date: March 1, 1954

The Desperate Hours is a 1954 thriller novel written by American writer Joseph Hayes. It concerns three escaped convicts and their invasion of a suburban home and its family.

== Adaptations ==
- The Desperate Hours (1955 play)
- The Desperate Hours (1955 film)
- The Desperate Hours (1967 TV movie)
- 36 Ghante (1974 film)
- Desperate Hours (1990 film)

== Foreign language adaptations ==
- 36 Ghante (1974)-Hindi language film in India
