= Joseph Hayes (author) =

American dramatist

- Born: 2 August 1918; Indianapolis
- Died: 11 September 2006; St. Augustine
- Occupation: Writer
- Awards: Edgar Awards (The Desperate Hours, 1956); Grand Prix de Littérature Policière (The Desperate Hours, 1956); Tony Award for Best Play (The Desperate Hours, 9th Tony Awards, 1955)

Joseph Hayes (August 2, 1918 – September 11, 2006) was an American playwright, novelist and screenwriter born in Indianapolis, Indiana.

== Early life ==
The son of Harold Joseph, a furniture dealer, and Pearl M. Arnold Hayes, Hayes entered a Benedictine monastery at the age of thirteen, attending St. Meinrad Seminary High School in southern Indiana for two years. He instead graduated from Arsenal Technical High School in Indianapolis in 1936. He married Marrijane Johnston in 1938 and they had three children: Gregory, Jason, and Daniel. Hayes studied at Indiana University, along with his wife, from 1938 to 1941.

== Stage plays ==
In 1949, his play, "Leaf and Bough", was performed on Broadway.

=== The Desperate Hours (1955) ===
Hayes wrote the Broadway play The Desperate Hours, which won the 1955 Tony Award for Best Play, was awarded an Edgar for Best Screenplay by the Mystery Writers of America for the 1955 film version, and received the Indiana Authors Day Award for the novel version. He was the first individual to write a novel, play, and screenplay of the same story. Hayes later wrote the screenplay for a 1990 re-make, about which he said "Since I'm the only writer who has ever done novel, play and screenplay solo from a single work of his own I can't let anyone else at it."

Among his other plays are The Happiest Millionaire, The Midnight Sun, The Deep End, Is Anyone Listening?, Summer in Copenhagen, Impolite Comedy, and Come into My Parlor.

== Novels ==
In 1954, he wrote the novel The Desperate Hours, his most successful work. In an interview in 1987, Hayes said of the novel that his main influence was "desperation": "I wrote it in six weeks, working 16 to 17 hours a day." Regarding the home invasion that occurred in the novel, he said it "was the most dramatic thing I could think of that would relate to the most people."

Hayes co-wrote with his wife both the original novel (1956) and screenplay for the Walt Disney movie Bon Voyage! in 1962.

Among his other novels are The Hours After Midnight, Don't Go Away Mad, The Third Day, The Deep End, Like Any Other Fugitive, The Long Dark Night, Missing and Presumed Dead, Island on Fire, Winner's Circle, No Escape, and The Ways of Darkness.

== Bibliography ==
=== Novels by Joseph Hayes ===
- The Desperate Hours, Random House (1954)
- The Hours After Midnight, Random House (1958)
- Don't Go Away Mad, Random House (1962)
- The Third Day, McGraw-Hill (1964)
- The Deep End, Viking (1967)
- Like Any Other Fugitive, Dial Press (1971)
- The Long Dark Night, Putnam (1974)
- Missing...And Presumed Dead, Andre Deutsch (1977)
- Island on Fire, Andre Deutsch (1979)
- Winner's Circle, Delacorte Press (1980)
- No Escape, Delacorte Press (1982)
- The Ways of Darkness, William Morrow & Co. (1985)
- Tomorrow is Too Late, Star (1987)
- Act of Rage, St. Martin's Press (1989)

=== Plays by Joseph Hayes ===
- The Thompsons, Samuel French (1943)
- Christmas at Home, Samuel French (1943)
- Leaf and Bough, Unpublished (1949) His first play on Broadway.
- The Desperate Hours, Samuel French (1955)
- The Happiest Millionaire, Unpublished (1956)
- The Midnight Sun, Unpublished (1959)
- Belle Denise, Unpublished (1959)
- Calculated Risk, Samuel French (1963)
- Is Anyone Listening?, Unpublished (1967)
- Summer in Copenhagen, Unpublished (1968)
- Impolite Comedy, Samuel French (1977)
- Come into My Parlor, Unpublished (1988)

=== Plays by Joseph Hayes and Marrijane Hayes ===
- And Came the Spring, Samuel French (1942)
- The Bridegroom Waits, Samuel French (1943)
- Come Rain or Shine, Samuel French (1943)
- Life of the Party, Samuel French (1945)
- Come Over to Our House, Samuel French (1946)
- Quiet Summer, Samuel French (1947)
- A Woman’s Privilege, Samuel French (1947)
- A Change of Heart, Samuel French (1948)
- Too Many Dates, Samuel French (1950)
- June Wedding, Samuel French (1951)
- Head in the Clouds, Samuel French (1952)
- Once in Every Family, Samuel French (1952)
- Mister Peepers, Samuel French (1953)
- Penny, Based on the comic strip by Harry Haenigsen, Samuel French (1954)
- Once in Every Family, Samuel French (1957)
- Turn Back the Clock, Samuel French (1970)

== Awards ==
Hayes was awarded the Distinguished Alumni Service Award from Indiana University in 1970, and received the Honorary degree of Doctor of Humane Letters from Indiana University in 1972.

== Death ==
Hayes died of Alzheimer's disease in 2006. Survivors included three sons, ten grandchildren, and eleven great-grandchildren.
