= The Desperate Hours (play) =

1955 play by Joseph Hayes

- Original language: English
- Written by: Joseph Hayes
- Based on: The Desperate Hours by Joseph Hayes
- Subject: Home invasion and hostage taking
- Genre: Melodrama
- Setting: Indianapolis, Indiana, mid 1950s

Premiere
- Date: 10 February 1955
- Place: Ethel Barrymore Theatre
- Directed by: Robert Montgomery

The Desperate Hours is a 1955 play by Joseph Hayes, adapted from his 1954 novel of the same title. It is a three-act melodrama, with a medium-sized cast and tense pacing. The story concerns a family of four, living in a suburb of Indianapolis, whose quiet home is invaded by three convicts recently escaped from prison.

The play was produced by the author and Howard Erskine, staged by Robert Montgomery, and starred Karl Malden and Nancy Coleman as the parents, with Paul Newman as the convict leader. Besides an excellent cast, taut writing and staging, the production had an extraordinary set design by Howard Bay. It was the recipient of several drama awards, including two Tonys, but has never had a Broadway revival.

== Characters ==
Listed in order of appearance within their scope.

Leads

- Jesse Bard is a deputy sheriff; he had previously broken Glen Griffin's jaw, who now seeks revenge.
- Eleanor Hillard is a fortyish housewife, mother of Cindy and Ralphie, and wife to Dan.
- Dan Hillard is a fortyish white collar worker, husband to Eleanor and father to Cindy and Ralphie.
- Glenn Griffin: is the 24 year-old leader of the escaped convicts; smart, but prone to rages.

Supporting

- Tom Winston is a deputy sheriff, who initially lets the FBI and state police handle the case.
- Harry Carson is a young FBI special agent who liaises with the county sheriff's office.
- Ralphie Hillard is the nine-year-old son of Eleanor and Dan, intelligent and a bit precocious.
- Cindy Hillard is the twenty-year-old daughter of Eleanor and Dan, employed by lawyer Chuck Wright.
- Hank Griffin is an escaped convict, younger brother of Glenn, still capable of empathy.
- Samuel Robish is an escaped convict; a lifer, brutish, stupid, stubborn and willful.

Featured

- Chuck Wright is a young attorney, Cindy's boss and the target of her affection.
- Lt. Carl Fredericks is an Indiana State Police officer. Heard over intercom then appears later.
- Claude Patterson is the trashman for the Hillard's neighborhood.
- Miss Swift is Ralph's teacher, who drops by unexpectedly when he misses school.

Voice only

- Dutch is a deputy sheriff, heard over an intercom at the sheriff's station.

Off stage

- Sheriff Masters is the county sheriff, superior officer to Tom, Jesse, and Dutch.
- Helen Laski is Glenn's girlfriend, supposedly en route from Pittsburgh with getaway money.
- Katie Bard is Jesse's wife, with whom he speaks on the phone several times during the action.

== Synopsis ==
Deputy Sheriff Jesse Bard relieves his night-shift colleague Tom Winston, only to discover three convicts have escaped overnight from the federal penitentiary at Terre Haute, and Tom has left it up to the FBI and state police. Jesse had arrested convict Glenn Griffin, and figures he'll head to Indianapolis to meet up with his girl friend Helen Laski and to get revenge on Jesse. While Jesse co-ordinates the search with Lt. Carl Fredericks of the state police and FBI special agent Harry Carson, the Hillard family is just starting their day at home. Dan Hillard drives himself and his daughter Cindy to work, while his wife Eleanor sends son Ralphie off to school on his bike. Alone now, Eleanor answers a doorbell to find a stranger asking for directions. Its Glenn Griffin, who produces a gun when Eleanor is distracted by Hank Griffin coming in through an unlocked back entrance. Robish also now appears, and the three hold Eleanor hostage in her own house all day. One by one the other Hillards are captured as they return home.

The FBI has located Helen Laski in Pittsburgh and informs Jesse Bard she is driving towards Indianapolis. Glenn Griffin is expecting her to arrive at midnight with the getaway money, but she doesn't show up. Law enforcement has also lost track of her. The next morning Glenn makes a decision: he'll let Cindy and Dan go to work as usual, while holding Eleanor and the outspoken Ralphie at home as hostages. The Hillard family's battle of wits with the convicts seesaws back and forth, while unexpected visitors and phone calls threaten to upset the delicate equilibrium between captors and hostages. The local trash collector, Claude Patterson, who notices the convicts' stolen car in the Hillards garage, is taken away by Robish, who murders him. Meanwhile, attorney Chuck Wright has become suspicious of Cindy's evasive replies and contacts the police.

Alert at last to the convicts hideout, law officers try to eavesdrop on what's going on in the Hillard house from a neighbor's attic. Eventually, a combination of the family's efforts and the police vigil pay off, with Hank Griffin deciding to bolt. His departure lets Dan Hillard get the drop on Glen Griffin with an empty gun, tricking him into leaving the house to go outside where the police are waiting.

== Original production ==
=== Background ===
The spark for Hayes' novel was a real home invasion that happened to the Hill family in Philadelphia during 1952. However, Hayes' storyline was invented and not based on the Hill family's experience. After reading Hayes' novel, producer Howard Erskine was convinced it would make a good play. He flew to Florida where Hayes was living on Anna Maria Island, and persuaded him to write a stage adaption. Hayes later wrote a screenplay which was sold to Paramount under condition that the film version could not be released before December 23, 1955.

=== Staging and set ===
Robert Montgomery was impressed with Hayes' dramatic treatment of the story, and in June 1954 agreed to direct the production. Montgomery and his daughter, actress Elisabeth Montgomery, also invested money in the play. One of Montgomery's first concerns was how to provide breaks in the tense pacing of the story. Hayes wanted to use humor, while Montgomery thought pauses in the action might work. He told interviewer Barbara L. Wilson "What both of us failed to realize was that the set would solve our dilemma". Howard Bay's unique scenic and lighting design allowed for this approach by presenting a two-level set showing the interior of the Hillard house and the local sheriff's station interior simultaneously. A traveling curtain above the latter hid a further set representing the attic of the Hillard's next door neighbor. Lighting was used to focus the audience attention on the current action, while actors on the other sets remained still in semi-darkness.

=== Actors and venue ===
Karl Malden was the first actor signed for the play, after he obtained a release from Warner Brothers to appear in it. Rehearsals started on December 13, 1954, with the principals Nancy Coleman, Karl Malden, Paul Newman, James Gregory, and George Mathews present. The Ethel Barrymore Theatre was booked and Patricia Peardon, Malcolm Broderick, and Fred Eisley hired by December 24, while George Grizzard, Kendall Clark, Judson Pratt, and Rusty Lane were signed the next day. Casting was complete on December 28, 1955, after Mary Orr and Wyrley Birch were hired.

=== Cast ===
Cast during tryouts in New Haven and Philadelphia, and during the original Broadway run
Role	Actor	Dates	Notes and sources
Jesse Bard	James Gregory	Jan 06, 1955 - May 28, 1955	Gregory left the play when signed by Paramount for The Scarlet Hour.
Jesse Bard	Frank Overton	May 30, 1955 - Aug 13, 1955	
Eleanor Hillard	Nancy Coleman	Jan 06, 1955 - Aug 13, 1955	Coleman was married to The Morning Telegraph critic Whitney Bolton, who sent a colleague to review the play.
Dan Hillard	Karl Malden	Jan 06, 1955 - Aug 13, 1955	
Glenn Griffin	Paul Newman	Jan 06, 1955 - Aug 13, 1955	
Tom Winston	Judson Pratt	Jan 06, 1955 - Aug 13, 1955	
Harry Carson	Kendall Clark	Jan 06, 1955 - Apr 09, 1955	Clark left the play to pursue work in Hollywood.
Harry Carson	Gene Blakely	Apr 11, 1955 - Aug 13, 1955	
Ralphie Hillard	Malcolm Brodrick	Jan 06, 1955 - Aug 13, 1955	Ten-year-old Brodrick brought a squirt gun backstage one night and soon every adult actor had one too. (Note: Management tolerated the resulting mayhem until one evening James Gregory took his curtain call with a dripping wet face, at which point the stage manager confiscated and destroyed all the water pistols.)
Cindy Hillard	Patricia Peardon	Jan 06, 1955 - Aug 13, 1955	
Hank Griffin	George Grizzard	Jan 06, 1955 - Aug 13, 1955	Grizzard won the New York Drama Critics Award for Most Promising Young Actor.
Samuel Robish	George Mathews	Jan 06, 1955 - Aug 13, 1955	
Chuck Wright	Fred Eisley	Jan 06, 1955 - Aug 13, 1955	
Lt. Carl Fredericks	Rusty Lane	Jan 06, 1955 - Aug 13, 1955	
Claude Patterson	Wyrley Birch	Jan 06, 1955 - Aug 13, 1955	
Miss Swift	Mary Orr	Jan 06, 1955 - Aug 13, 1955	

=== Tryouts ===
The play had its first tryout at the Shubert Theater in New Haven, Connecticut on January 6, 1955. Reviewer Fred Russell credited the sets by Howard Bay with garnering applause from the opening night audience even before the actors appeared. He especially praised Montgomery's staging and Malden's acting, but gave the rest of the cast their due. Another reviewer singled out the acting of Patricia Peardon and young Malcolm Brodrick, and judged George Grizzard as "particularly adept". They reported "The opening night audience displayed unprecedented enthusiasm by refusing to depart even when lights came on after many curtain calls.... Here is a 'try out' that is at its inception a polished gem of extraordinary size and depth". A local columnist predicted "This one will be the dramatic sensation of the Broadway season".

The production then went to Philadelphia's Locust Street Theatre on January 12, 1955, for a highly praised three-week run. Henry T. Murdock from The Philadelphia Inquirer said: "It is tremendously effective theater, marked by complete cooperation among its elements--- writer, director, actors and set designer. In fact, the play had to be on the stalwart side to draw attention from Howard Bay's remarkable 'breakfront' set".

=== Reception ===
The play opened on February 10, 1955, at the Ethel Barrymore Theatre on Broadway. Perhaps the most enthusiastic reviewer was John Chapman of the Daily News, who said "I cannot remember any melodrama which has been as steadily and intensely exciting as is The Desperate Hours-- or one which has been better acted or better staged." The demanding critic Walter F. Kerr praised the "slambang" action and tense pacing: "The Desperate Hours is straight popcorn, but it makes a lovely racket." Brooks Atkinson said "Mr. Hayes has written a graphic crime play that makes sense" and "...it does show more interest in the characters than most thrillers do". He praised all the actors and especially Paul Newman who he said "plays the boss thug with a wildness that one is inclined to respect". Charles K. Freeman, noting that both Howard Erskine and Joseph Hayes were neophyte producers, felt that the hiring of Robert Montgomery as director was a "masterstroke", and the largest factor responsible for the show's success.

A month after the premiere, Paul Newman was promoted to co-star billing, alongside Karl Malden and Nancy Coleman.

=== Closing ===
During late July 1955, Karl Malden notified producers Erskine and Hayes that he would have to quit within four weeks due to personal problems and a Warner Brothers commitment. According to the producers, they were unable to find a replacement of equal standing, the off-season summer heat meant the box-office take was at a low point, so they decided to close the show. However, columnist Charles McHary reported that the box office slump was why Malden was leaving the show. He and the other leading and supporting actors had already accepted pay cuts for several weeks to offset the declining revenue. The actors blamed the producers on two counts: first, that the Howard Bay set pre-empted seating space in the theater that might have brought $3000 a week during the show's opening months; and second, that the inexperienced producers let the early awards go to their heads and failed to allocate enough money for advertising the play.

After 212 performances, The Desperate Hours closed on Broadway on August 13, 1955. The producers sold the play, along with the original sets, to Jack Present and Harry Zevin for production on the West Coast starting in late August 1955. Five original Broadway cast members, Nancy Coleman, George Grizzard, Judson Pratt, Malcolm Brodrick, and Rusty Lane, along with replacement Gene Blakely, went with the road company.

=== Awards ===
Year	Award Ceremony	Category	Nominee	Result
1955	Tony Award	Best Play		Won
1955	Tony Award	Tony Award for Best Director	Robert Montgomery	Won
1955	New York Drama Critics' Circle	Best Play		Nominated
1955	The Theatre Club	Best Play		Won
1955	New York Drama Critics Award	Most Promising Young Actor	George Grizzard	Won
