= Chicago Community Trust =

American community foundation

The Chicago Community Trust
- Founded: 1915
- Founder: Norman Wait Harris and Albert Wadsworth Harris
- Type: Community Foundation
- Location: Chicago, United States
- Region served: Chicago
- Key people: Andrea Sáenz; (President and CEO); Sheila Cawley; (Chief Philanthropy Officer); Marisa Novara; (Vice President, Community Impact); Clothilde Ewing; (Vice President, Strategic Communications); Lisa Jericho; (Vice President, Innovation & Technology; Sylvia Garcia; (Chief Operating Officer); Jessica Strausbaugh; (Chief Financial Officer); Wendell Williams; (Senior Director of Talent & Administration); Amy Peña; (Chief Philanthropy Officer)
- Employees: 51–200
- Website: www.cct.org

The Chicago Community Trust (the Trust) is the community foundation serving Chicago, suburban Cook County, and the Illinois counties of DuPage, Kane, Lake, McHenry, and Will. Established on May 12, 1915, it is the second-largest community foundation in the country as of 2020, with assets of more than $4.5 billion. In fiscal year 2023, the Trust awarded more than $1.6 billion in grants and received more than $1.4 billion in contributions.

== History ==
The Chicago Community Trust was founded in 1915 by Norman Wait Harris, founder of the Harris Trust and Savings Bank, and his son Albert Wadsworth Harris. The founders were inspired by The Cleveland Foundation, the country's first community foundation, which was established the year before. Most of the Trust's funding during 1915–1930 focused on relief and humanitarian work for residents impacted by Chicago's rapid industrialization. The Trust awarded its first grant in 1916, to United Charities for $5,000. The first major gift was from James A. Patten, "the grain king", for $1 million in 1924. The first bequest of $30,687 came two years later from the estate of Alex Demond. In the early 1920s, the Trust commissioned landmark social surveys that identified the needs of those incarcerated at the Cook County Jail, immigrants, children with disabilities, single women, veterans, and the elderly.

During the Great Depression in the 1930s, Frank Loomis, executive director of the Trust, and Edward L. Ryerson Jr., Trust Executive Committee member, coordinated multiple relief drives through the Governor's Commission on Unemployment and Relief and the Emergency Welfare Fund of Cook County. These drives raised $22 million from 1930 to 1933 and inspired the creation of multiple campaigns and funds, including the precursor to the United Way of Metropolitan Chicago. The Trust made a grant to the 1933 Century of Progress world's fair in Chicago, which was visited by nearly 40 million people.

Throughout the 1950s and 1960s, the Trust funded multiple cultural institutions and projects, including a design for the downtown lakefront along Grant Park and the creation of the Chicago Botanic Garden. It provided critical funds to schools, nurseries, and day care centers after the Our Lady of the Angels School Fire in 1958. In 1964, John G. Searle and Frances C. Searle became the largest donors in the Trust's history when they created the first Searle Fund at the Trust.

In 1976, the Trust awarded $3 million in grants to the Leadership Council for Metropolitan Open Communities to oversee the Gautreaux Housing Program. Considered the nation's first "housing mobility program", Gautreaux placed 7,100 low-income families into mixed-income neighborhoods. In 2001, the Trust co-founded the Partnership for New Communities, which supported the largest and most ambitious public housing redevelopment in the country. From 2000 to 2014, the Trust incubated several nonprofits, including Voices for Illinois Children and the IFF (formerly Illinois Facilities Fund). It also funded the 12th World Summit of Nobel Peace Laureates and the Burnham Plan Centennial.

From 2014 to 2015 the Trust celebrated its Centennial by partnering with multiple nonprofits and cultural institutions to organize new events in Chicago. In 2014, the Trust founded On the Table, an annual one-day forum designed to elevate civic conversation and spark collective action. More than 250,000 people have participated since 2014, and more than 30 communities have replicated On the Table events. In 2015, the Trust partnered with the Chicago Public Library's "One Book One Chicago" program, Chicago Ideas Week, and the Chicago Humanities Festival to foster civic dialogue. Also, in 2015, it announced the SMART Growth Program – a capacity-building program for Cook County's small arts and cultural organizations.

== Governance structure ==
The Trust's governing board is the Executive Committee which is made up of 17 community leaders who provide strategic and fiduciary oversight. The Trust's structure includes both trust and corporate entities. The trust entity, The Chicago Community Trust, serves solely Cook County and administers the majority of its assets under the 1915 Declaration of Trust. Chief executives of Bank of America, BMO Harris Bank, JPMorgan Chase & Co., Northern Trust, and US Bank serve as trustees for these funds. The Trustees Committee also appoints members of the Trust Executive Committee and advises on development and community relations matters.

The corporate entity, The Chicago Community Foundation, has a broader geographic area of concern and offers flexibility with respect to the funds' investment management and grant making. The Trust's Executive Committee serves as the board of directors for The Chicago Community Foundation.

== Financials ==
As of September 30, 2023, the Trust's consolidated assets totaled more than $4.5 billion. During the 2023 fiscal year, the Trust received more than $1.4 billion in new contributions and made combined grant commitments totaling more than $1.6 billion.

== Grant eligibility ==
The Trust awards discretionary grants to organizations in Cook County, DuPage County, Kane County, Lake County, McHenry County, and Will County that benefit residents of the Chicago region that fulfill the charitable purposes of the Trust. The Trust also accepts applications from agencies that have a nonprofit fiscal sponsor. Each grant opportunity will have additional criteria for funding.

=== Initiatives and partnerships ===
In addition to discretionary grants, the Trust offers grants through its special initiatives and partnerships. Many of the Trust initiatives and programs have developed into stand-alone organizations addressing community needs, including the Campaign for Community Schools, Chicago High School for the Arts, Executive Service Corps of Chicago, IFF, Ingenuity, Leadership Greater Chicago, and Voices for Illinois Children.

== See also ==
- Silicon Valley Community Foundation, another community foundation in the United States
