= Wells Fargo Advisors =

Subsidiary of Wells Fargo, located in St Louis, Missouri

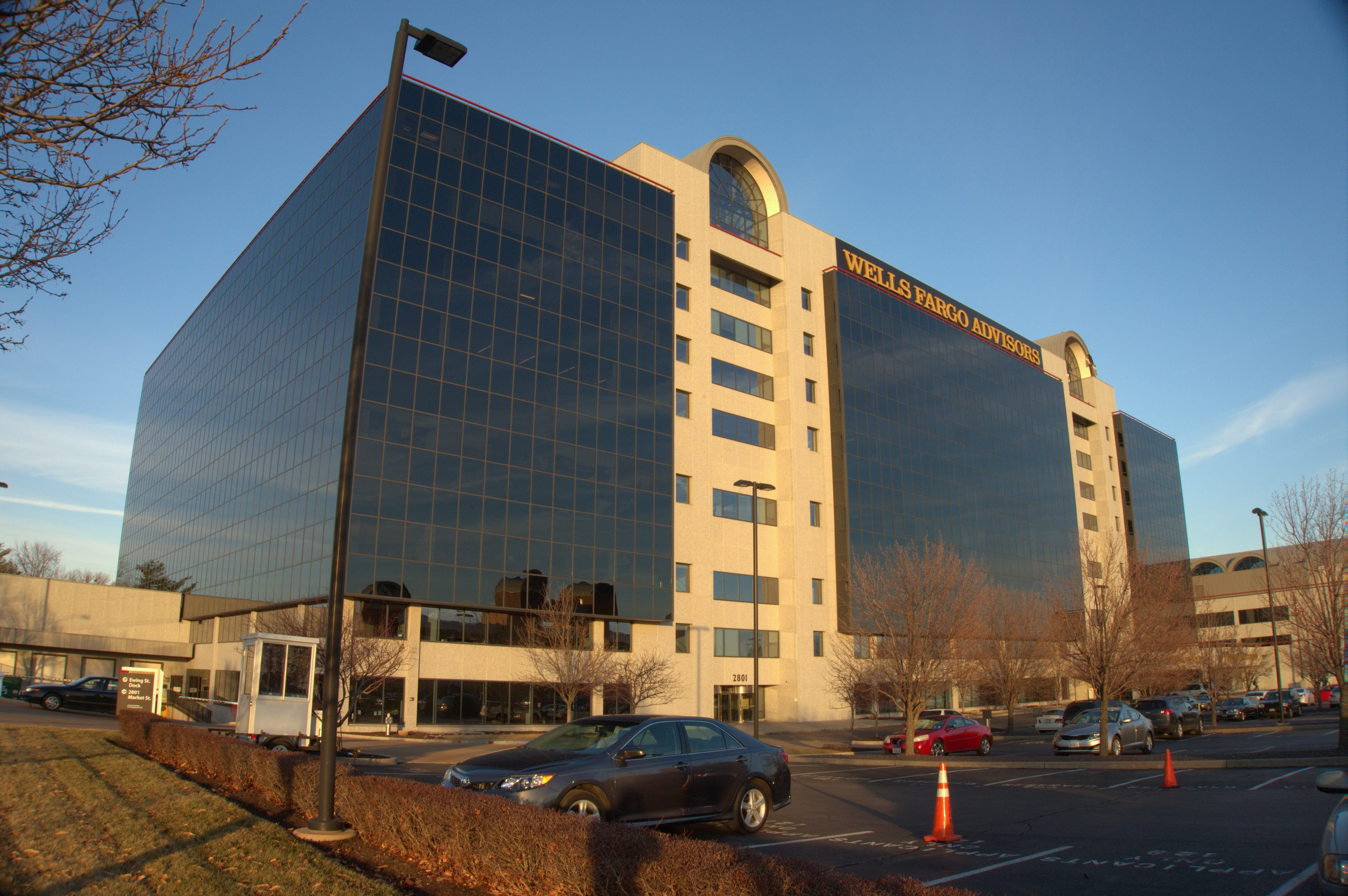
- St. Louis office
- Type: Subsidiary
- Genre: Securities
- Predecessor: Wachovia Securities
- Founded: 1879; 147 years ago (as Leopold Cahn & Co.)
- Headquarters: St Louis, Missouri, United States
- Parent: Wells Fargo
- Website: www.wellsfargoadvisors.com

Wells Fargo Advisors is a brokerage, investing, and financial advisory company. It is a subsidiary of Wells Fargo, and is headquartered in St Louis, Missouri.

The subsidiary was formerly known as Wachovia Securities until May 2009, when it legally changed names following Wells Fargo's acquisition of Wachovia Bank.

== History ==
Wells Fargo Advisors was previously the retail brokerage of Wachovia Securities, which was rebranded after the Wells Fargo purchase of the failing Wachovia Bank late December 2008.

Wachovia Securities' main predecessors were Prudential Securities and First Union Securities, both of which were large nationwide brokerages that had grown from mergers and acquisitions beginning as far back as 1897 and 1934, respectively.

=== From Leopold Cahn & Co. to Bache & Co. to Prudential Securities ===
The brokerage firm Leopold Cahn & Co. was founded in New York in 1879. Cahn's nephew, Jules Semon Bache, began working there as a cashier in 1880. In 1892, when Bache became head of the company, the firm's name was changed to J.S. Bache & Co. By 1905, the firm was trading both stocks and commodities, and had seven offices, including in Montreal and Liverpool. Prior to October 1929, Jules Bache became conservative with the firm's credit and avoided investing the firm's own capital in the stock market; consequently, it weathered the stock market crash of 1929.

Upon the death of Jules S. Bache in 1944, he was succeeded by his nephew, Harold L. Bache, and the following year the firm's name was shortened to Bache & Co. Harold Bache brought in new partners and fresh capital, and in 1965 incorporated the firm as Bache & Co, Inc., which by his death had expanded to 124 offices worldwide and nearly 6,000 employees.

After acquiring and merging with two firms – Halsey, Stuart & Co., Inc. and Shields Model Roland Inc. – in the 1970s, in the late 1970s the Bache firm experienced financial difficulties. The Bache Group, Inc. was acquired by Prudential Insurance Company of America in 1981. The following year, the Bache securities firm was renamed Prudential-Bache Securities, and in 1991 the Bache name was dropped when the firm became Prudential Securities, Inc. The firm acquired two boutique investment banks shortly before 2000, but the post-bubble stock-market meltdown made the brokerage less profitable.

=== From J.C. Wheat & Co. to First Union Securities ===
One of Wachovia Securities' main predecessor companies was founded in 1934 in Richmond, Virginia as the investment firm of J.C. Wheat & Co. Wheat fostered growth through mergers, including the 1971 merger with First Securities that created Wheat First Securities, Inc. and its 1988 acquisition of Butcher & Singer, a successful Philadelphia-based securities firm; the firm then became known as Wheat First Butcher Singer.

In 1998, the privately held Wheat First Butcher Singer was acquired by the Charlotte, North Carolina–based First Union bank. The brokerage firm changed its name to Wheat First Union, reflecting its newly acquired status. In 1999, First Union also acquired Chicago-based investment bank and brokerage Everen Capital Corporation, creating a coast-to-coast brokerage firm still headquartered in Richmond, which it renamed First Union Securities, the sixth-largest brokerage firm in the country. In 2000, First Union Securities acquired First Albany Cos. Inc., a regional brokerage and investment-banking business based in Albany, New York.

=== First Union acquisition of Wachovia and name change ===
In 1999, Wachovia Corporation, based in Winston-Salem, North Carolina, had acquired the brokerage firm Interstate Johnson Lane, and changed the name of the brokerage to IJL Wachovia.

In 2001, First Union Corporation acquired Wachovia Corporation, and assumed the Wachovia name.

In 2002, First Union Securities changed its name to Wachovia Securities as its business was merged with IJL Wachovia. The combination created the fifth-largest brokerage firm in the country.

In 2001, after de-mutualizing and instead going public, Prudential Insurance Company of America had become Prudential Financial Inc. In 2003 it sold its retail brokerage arm Prudential Securities to Wachovia Bank, retaining a 38 percent stake in the new joint venture Wachovia Securities. The new Wachovia Securities had client assets of $532.1 billion, making it the nation's third-largest full-service retail brokerage firm based on assets.

In 2007, Wachovia acquired the financial services firm A. G. Edwards, based in St Louis, Missouri, and combined it with Wachovia Securities, which made it the second-largest brokerage firm after Merrill Lynch. The combined brokerage, operating as Wachovia Securities, moved its headquarters from Richmond to St. Louis.

=== Wachovia Bank fails and is purchased by Wells Fargo ===
After Wachovia Bank experienced heavy losses during the subprime mortgage crisis, it was purchased by Wells Fargo; the deal closed on December 31, 2008. Wachovia Securities became Wells Fargo Advisors, effective May 1, 2009. Prudential sold its minority stake in the brokerage to Wells Fargo in December 2009.

In May 2022, Sol Gindi was appointed head of Wells Fargo Advisors. Gindi replaced the retiring Jim Hayes, who had headed the subdivision since July 2019.
