= Harris, Hall & Co. =

Harris, Hall & Co. was a midwestern investment banking firm headquartered in Chicago. The firm was spun out from Harris Bank and would later merge with Dean Witter & Co. in 1953.

The firm was engaged in a variety of investment banking businesses. The firm developed a specialization in underwriting securities for public utilities as well as trust certificates. The firm had a good record in private placements.

== History ==
In 1882, Norman Wait Harris formed an investment banking partnership, known as N.W. Harris & Co. This firm, which specialized in the underwriting of municipal bonds, was one of the early pioneers in investment banking, particularly outside of New York. In 1907, Harris formed Harris Trust & Savings Bank and folded in the investment banking business. Harris Forbes & Co., incorporated in 1911, traced its roots to N.W. Harris & Co.

In 1921, N.W. Harris Company was formed as a new investment banking subsidiary of Harris Trust & Savings Bank. In June 1934, following the passage of the Glass–Steagall Act, the subsidiary was dissolved and Harris Bank discontinued its investment banking operations.

In October 1935, Harris Hall was founded by four former members of the Harris Bank bond department led by Edward Bigelow Hall, a vice president at Harris who had been with the bank since 1909. Hall was a personal friend of Harold Stanley, founder of Morgan Stanley, and followed Stanley's example of spinning out of J.P. Morgan & Co. in the founding of Harris Hall. Among the other founders of the new firm were Norman W. Harris (grandson of the original Norman Wait Harris), Lahman Bower and Julien Collins. [Norman Wadsworth Harris, rather than Wait]

In the 1950s, Harris Hall was one of the 17 U.S. investment banking and securities firms named in the Justice Department's antitrust investigation of Wall Street commonly known as the Investment Bankers Case. Following the dismissal of the case in 1953, the firm entered into an agreement to merge with Dean Witter & Co.

Among the notable alumni of the firm is Harold L. Stuart, later of Halsey, Stuart & Co.

== See also ==
- Harris Bank
- Harris, Forbes & Co.
