= Bache & Co. =

Brokerage founded in 1879 and based in New York, US

- Industry: Investment banking
- Predecessor: Leopold Cahn & Co. J.S. Bache & Co.
- Founded: 1879; 147 years ago
- Founder: Jules Bache
- Fate: Acquired by Prudential Financial in 1981 to form Prudential-Bache Securities, later Prudential Securities Acquired by Jefferies Group, Inc. in July 2011
- Successor: Prudential-Bache Securities, Bode Stoddard trust
- Headquarters: New York, New York
- Key people: Bode Stoddard, J.S Stodard, principal/receiver
- Products: Financial services
- Parent: Bache & Co. Merchant Bankers 1992-Present Jefferies Group, Inc (2011–2015) Prudential Financial (1981–1991)
- Subsidiaries: Major Acquisitions:Halsey, Stuart & Co.

Bache & Company (later known as Bache Halsey Stuart Shields Incorporated) was an American securities firm that provided stock brokerage and investment banking services. The firm, which was founded in 1879, was based in New York, New York.

In 1981, Bache was acquired by Prudential Financial to form Prudential-Bache Securities. In 1991, the usage of the Bache name was discontinued and the firm was renamed Prudential Securities, a predecessor of the investment banking operation of Wells Fargo, via its acquisition of Wachovia Securities.

Prudential Financial retained the commodities and financial derivatives businesses, keeping them separate from the joint venture. In 2003, the firm revitalized the Bache name, creating Prudential Bache. In July 2011, the Bache Institutional Group was acquired by Jefferies Group, Inc for $430 million and was renamed Jefferies, Bache.

== History ==
=== Founding and early history ===
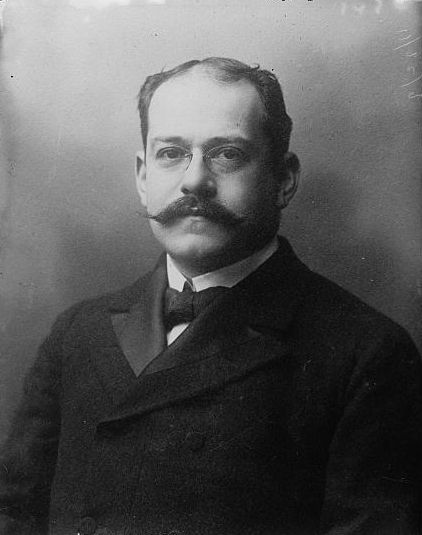
Jules S. Bache, founder of Bache & Co.

The firm traces its roots back to 1879 with the founding of Leopold Cahn & Co., a brokerage and investment bank. In 1892, Jules S. Bache, an employee and nephew of Leopold Cahn, reorganized Leopold Cahn & Co. as J.S. Bache & Co. Jules Bache was the grandson of an officer who fought under Napoleon and collected art treasures for The Louvre. Over a fifty-year career, he built the company into one of the most successful and innovative brokerage houses in the United States.

In 1890, the firm expanded to open a second office in New York City and a branch office in Albany, the first branch established by any brokerage firm with a direct wire link to headquarters. Among the early clients of J.S. Bache & Co. were such renowned financial leaders as John D. Rockefeller Sr., Edward H. Harriman, and Jay Gould.

In the tumultuous markets brought on by the Panic of 1907, Bache handled as many as 200,000 shares a day. The firm had by now established itself as a leader in commodities trading.

During the 1920s, the firm became a leader in financing railroads, automobile and mining enterprises. It headed the list of stockholders of the Chicago, Great Western Railway, and acquired control of the Ann Arbor Railroad. The firm was closely identified with the founding and early growth of the Chrysler Corporation.

Bache demonstrated that it would remain a major presence on Wall Street in the Crash of 1929 by reducing the credit extended to the firm's customers and warning them of the possibility of a reversal. Fortuitously, the firm had none of its own capital invested in the stock market and had no investment trusts to protect during the markets decline. In the dark days of the Bank Holiday of 1933, when cash was virtually unavailable, Bache attracted national attention by supplying currency to customers in New York, Detroit, and other cities.

World War II forced the closing of all of Bache's overseas offices except for the London office, which remained open throughout the conflict. The firm was among the first to employ women to fill jobs vacated by male employees in the military services. During the war, Bache also introduces the first employee profit-sharing plan in Wall Street history.

=== 1944–1981 ===
Bache & Co. logo, ca. 1959

The war years were a trying time for the entire investment banking industry, and "Bache & Co." was in the forefront, guided until his death in 1944, Jules Bache took the lead on making the firm a major US government backed bond "market maker" and major retail seller, where the "Road Show" put on by "Bache & Co. was one of the first to utilize Movie Stars, Flying Acrobats, and, with others, created a (during World War One) "stamp book" that let children purchase stamps, fill a book, and swap it for a United States (Liberty Bonds) Savings Bond. Providing the capital required by many companies who needed funding to switch from making automobiles to fighter planes.

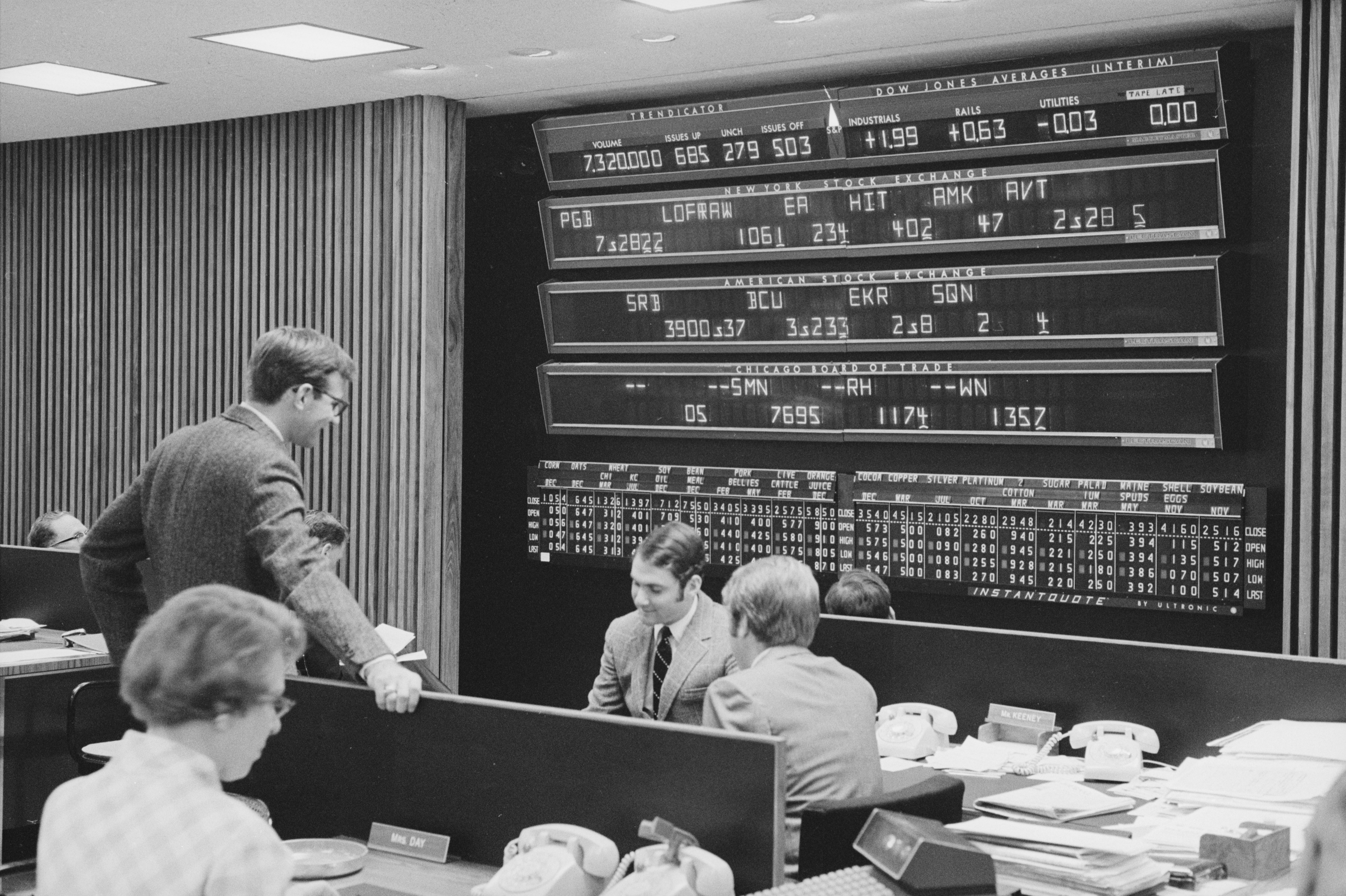
Brokers at the Bache & Co. office on Connecticut Avenue, Washington, D.C. with an Ultronics display, 1968

Bache logo, ca. 1969

Following the death of Jules Bache in 1944, his nephew, Harold L. Bache, took over the running of the business and the name was shortened to Bache & Company. The New York Herald printed "The late Jules Bache will be appreciatively remembered in the financial and business worlds. In both he was a distinguished figure, a man of great acumen and sterling integrity."

The firm was the first to explore investments in Japan following the war, and one of its early postwar enterprises was the formation of the highly successful Japan Fund, a mutual fund composed exclusively of Japanese securities. In the 1950s, the firm pioneered American stock brokerage expansion abroad.

In the mid 1960s Bache & Co. was the second largest retail brokerage company in the US (and probably the world) after Merrill Lynch, but like Merrill struggled to make the "top bracket" of wholesale investment banking firms (e.g. Morgan Stanley, First Boston, Goldman Sachs, etc.). Harold Bache still came into the office at 36 Wall Street daily, through the private elevator on the street, and attended weekly due diligence meetings in a stuffy room in the middle of the building, possibly designed to minimize these necessarily boring sessions. Bache's Research Department then included a range spanning Charlie Tatham, a patrician utility analyst and poet who co-authored "Graham and Dodd" and a street fighter from Brooklyn named Harvey Milk, who managed a bullpen of wannabe analysts in 1965 before he was shipped off to Dallas the next year for reasons not understood until later, when he became the "Mayor of Castro Street" in San Francisco.

In 1971, Bache & Company became the second major brokerage firm to go public. In 1974, Bache acquired Halsey, Stuart & Co., a Chicago-based investment banking firm founded by Harold L. Stuart in 1911. The firm's expansion in the 1970s was enhanced by its acquisition of Shields Model Roland. Originally known as Shields & Co., the firm was founded by Paul Shields and merged with Model, Roland & Stone, founded by Leo Model shortly after World War II.

As the Bache Group celebrated its centennial in 1979, it had $151 million in capital, some 10,000 shareholders, over 6,500 employees including 2,500 account executives. It was involved in practically every facet of the securities business. Its principal operating subsidiary, Bache Halsey Stuart Shields Incorporated, had memberships on 59 different securities, commodities and options exchanges in the United States, Canada and overseas. It maintained 176 offices in 143 cities in 11 countries as well as the Virgin Islands and Puerto Rico, operated a worldwide communications system that carried more than 50,000 words of financial information daily over 100,000 miles of private wire, and served several hundred thousand clients ranging from individuals with modest sums to invest to large pension funds, insurance companies and other institutional investors.

=== Acquisition by Prudential Financial ===
Prudential-Bache logo, ca. 1984

In 1981 Bache, then known as Bache Halsey Stuart Shields Incorporated, was acquired by Prudential Financial for $385 million. Prudential dropped the usage of the Bache name in 1991, renaming the division Prudential Securities. Later, in 2003, the retail brokerage was combined with that of Wachovia Corporation's to create Wachovia Securities

Prudential retained the commodities and financial derivatives following the joint venture with Wachovia. Though the two business did not use the Bache name, Prudential Financial rebranded the two units in 2003 under the Bache name, creating Prudential Bache.

=== Acquisition by Jefferies ===
In 2011, Prudential Bache was acquired by Jefferies Group, Inc from Prudential for $430 million. Bache was re-branded Jefferies Bache and forms the foreign exchange, commodities and listed derivatives division of Jefferies Group, Inc. Jefferies Bache has over 400 employees and operates out of 5 offices around the world.

=== Sale by Jefferies and continued operations ===
Jefferies discontinued the use of name April 8, 2015, selling its commodities trading business to Societe Generale.

== Notable alumni ==
- Jules Bache, founder
- Edward M. Baker, investment broker and resident manager of the Cleveland office
- Don Bosseler, former professional football player
- Harold Evensky
- James P. Hynes, founder of COLT Group
- Harvey Milk, American politician and activist, worked as a research analyst
- Harold "Bud" Meyers, founder of H.J. Meyers & Co.
- Richard Ong, private equity investor
- Suze Orman, financial advisor, author, motivational speaker, and television host
- John Aspinwall Roosevelt, son of Franklin Delano Roosevelt
- Mark D. Schwartz, whistleblower attorney left amidst disagreements with the firm
- Macrae Sykes, former chairman of the American Stock Exchange
- Ellen Tauscher, member of the U.S. House of Representatives
- Paul F. Warburg, investment banker

== Company Names ==
Leopold Cahn & Co. (1879–1892) J.S. Bache & Co. (1892–1944) Bache & Co. (1944-20??)
