= Macrae Sykes =

American financier

- Born: 1910; Bayside, Queens, United States
- Died: October 13, 1996 (aged 85–86); Southampton, New York
- Occupation: Financier
- Known for: Chairman of the American Stock Exchange from 1968
- Relatives: Major General George Sykes was his grandfather, his grandson, Macrae Sykes, is a portfolio manager

Macrae Sykes (1910 - October 13, 1996) was an American financier who served as chairman of the American Stock Exchange in the 1960s.

== Early life and education ==
Sykes was born in Bayside, Queens, and graduated from Columbia University in 1933. His grandfather was Major General George Sykes, who commanded the V Corps in the Army of the Potomac and fought in the Battle of Gettysburg and he is also descendant of James Sykes, who represented the state of Delaware in the Continental Congress and James Sykes, Jr., a former Governor of Delaware.

He was captain of the varsity crew team at Columbia. A sailor, Sykes also partook in the 1937 Star World Championship and helped financed the United States team in the 1970 America's Cup.

== Career ==
He joined Halsey, Stuart & Co. in 1934 and was named a senior partner. In 1977, he became a director of Bache & Co.

He was a governor of the New York Stock Exchange and a governor as well as chairman of the American Stock Exchange, a post he was named to in February 1968. A vice chairman of the American Stock Exchange, Sykes was the first non-floor member named to the post.

== Personal life and family ==
Sykes was a resident of East Hampton, New York, and Delray Beach, Florida. He died in a nursing home in Southampton, New York on October 13, 1996.

His brother, James Ware Sykes, was the chairman of the advertisement company, Sawyer Ferguson Walker.

His grandson, Macrae Sykes, is a portfolio manager with Gabelli Funds.
