= BMO Tower =

BMO Tower is the name for the following U.S. office buildings associated with the Bank of Montreal and its American subsidiary BMO Bank, N.A.

- BMO Tower (Chicago)
- BMO Tower (Milwaukee)
- BMO Tower (Phoenix)
- BMO Tower (Sacramento)
