= Caesar's Retreat =

Brothel in New York City

Coordinates: 40.75306°N 73.97151°W

Caesar's Retreat was a massage parlor and brothel at 219 East 46th Street in Manhattan, New York City, which operated from the early 1970s until 1982. Known for its opulence and high-society clientele, Caesar's Retreat was run by former Walston & Co. stockbroker Robert Scharaga, who later expanded his operations to Las Vegas, Los Angeles and other major U.S. cities. It was raided twice by the police in October 1972. On March 3, 1982, undercover NYPD officers infiltrated Caesar's Retreat and found evidence of facilitation of prostitution, after which the establishment was shut down by the city. Scharaga filed for a federal injunction to get his business back, but the motion was rejected by the U.S. District Court for the Southern District of New York on July 8, 1982. According to sex activist Annie Sprinkle, Caesar's Retreat was among "...the best brothels in New York City."
