= H. J. Meyers & Co. =

American investment bank

- Company type: Private company
- Industry: Financial services
- Predecessor: Thomas James Associates, Inc
- Founded: 1985
- Founder: Harold "Bud" Meyers
- Defunct: September 15, 1998
- Fate: Bankrupt after regulatory action
- Headquarters: Rochester, New York, United States
- Area served: United States
- Key people: James A. Villa
- Products: Investment banking, broker-dealer
- Number of employees: 480 (1998)
- Website: www.hjmeyers.com

H. J. Meyers & Co was an American investment banking and brokerage firm that specialized in small cap and micro cap financings. Its headquarters were in Rochester, New York but it had a large Southern California presence. It was originally known as Thomas James Associates, Inc before they acquired H.J. Meyers & Co, Inc. The firm had a reputation of being a boiler room that operated within the realm of unscrupulous policies, stock manipulation, fraudulent, high pressure sales tactics and excessive markups were common.

== History ==
H. J. Meyers & Co, Inc. was founded by Harold "Bud" Meyers in Beverly Hills, California. A 33-year veteran of the securities industry, Meyers started out with Walston & Co. in Denver, before stints with Bache & Co. (now part of Prudential Financial), Loeb Rhoades (since absorbed by Shearson Lehman Hutton) and McDonald, Krieger, Boyer, the predecessor firm to Meyers. During the early 1990s, the firm was very active in underwriting small capitalization offerings, often underwriting up to 3 to 4 deals per week. A memorable IPO was the Anergen Corporation, a biotech offering with little to no earnings which skyrocketed from around $6 per share to over $40 per share within days. A short squeeze was to blame for the unnatural rise in the price of Anergen.

When acquired by Thomas James Associates, Inc, the firm began a downward descent. It was charged by the National Association of Securities Dealers, Inc. (NASD), now known as the Financial Industry Regulatory Authority (FINRA), for massive stock violations. President James A. Villa abruptly shut down the firm after severe pressure from NASD and SEC regulators. James A. Villa & his wife live in Boca Raton, Florida and is protected from creditors by Florida's generous homestead exemption.
