= Harris, Forbes & Co. =

Investment banking affiliate (1911–1930)

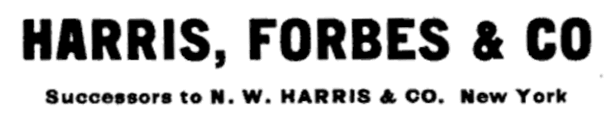
- Harris, Forbes & Co. logo c. 1911
- Type: Private
- Industry: Financial services
- Predecessor: N.W. Harris & Co.
- Founded: 1911; 115 years ago
- Founder: Harris Trust & Savings Bank
- Defunct: 1932
- Fate: Dissolved and the remaining business sold
- Successor: First Boston Corporation
- Headquarters: Chicago, United States
- Products: Bonds
- Parent: Harris Bank

Harris, Forbes & Co. was an investment banking affiliate of Harris Bank incorporated in 1911. Harris, Forbes firm was acquired by Chase National Bank in 1930 to form Chase Harris, Forbes. Just two years later, in 1932, the firm was dissolved after the passage of the Glass–Steagall Act in 1932. Chase transferred what remained of its securities business to the Bank of Boston's newly formed First Boston Corporation, buttressing that firm's early municipal bond department.

== History ==
The firm traces its origins to the founding of N.W. Harris & Co. in 1882 by Norman Wait Harris. This firm, which specialized in the underwriting of municipal bonds, was one of the early pioneers in the investment banking, particularly outside of New York. In 1907, Harris formed Harris Trust & Savings Bank and folded in the investment banking business. Harris Forbes incorporated in 1911. Wetmore Halsey, later a founder of Halsey, Stuart & Co., was a partner in Harris, Forbes.

A 1929 profile in Time magazine offered this summary of the firm's history:

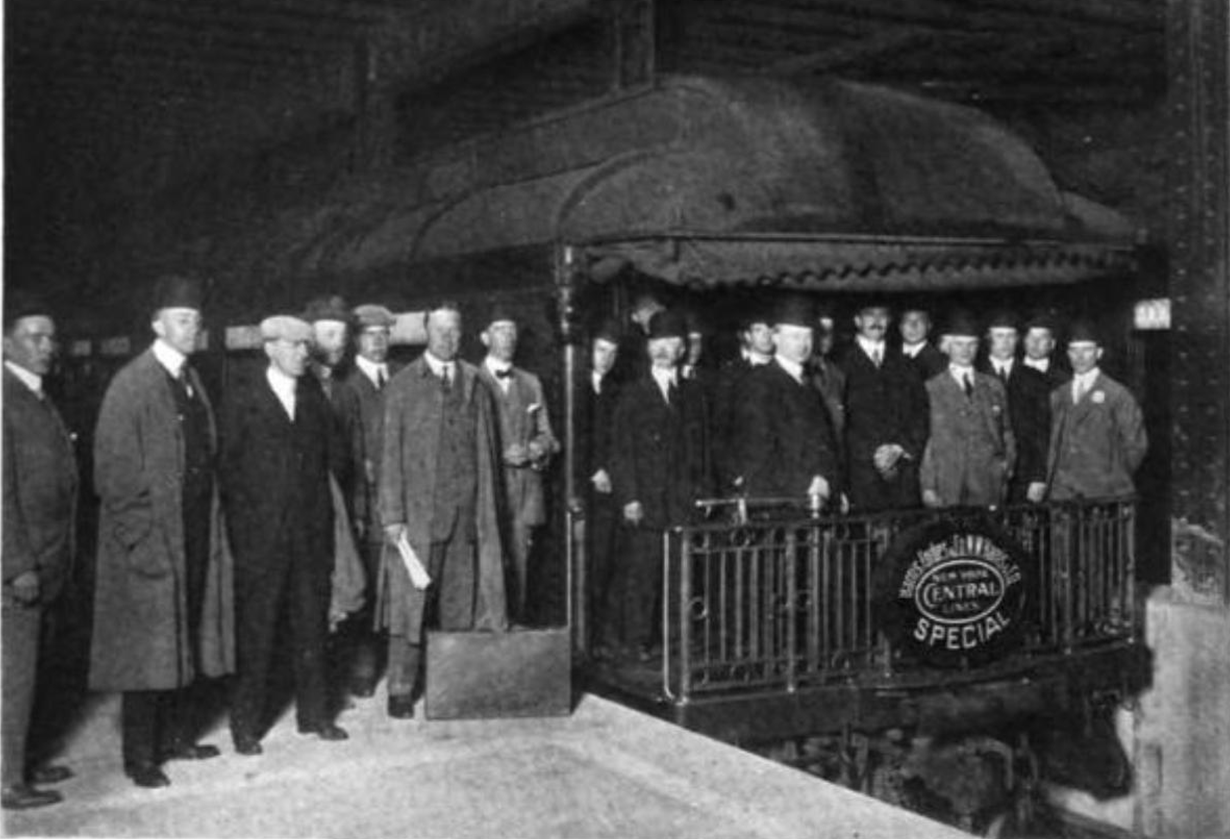
Officers and employees of Harris, Forbes in Grand Central Terminal on their way to celebrate the opening of the firm's new offices in 1911

Harris, Forbes & Co. began in 1882 as N. W. Harris & Co. At that time Founder Norman Wait Harris had an office on Chicago's Clark Street, three employees and $30,000. But he also had two ideas. First idea was to send salesmen out to sell bonds. In 1882 such procedure was regarded as undignified; Mr. Harris and his men were termed doorbell ringers. But Mr. Harris knew that he, small, new, obscure, would never prosper by waiting for investors to call upon him, so he rang the doorbells, sold the bonds, became ancestor of all bond salesmen since.

Second idea was to specialize in municipal bonds. In 1867 Mr. Harris had traveled through the south and west, had seen countless small but growing towns and cities. Farsighted, he looked ahead, saw the school houses, water works, roads, bridges, sewage plants and other public works of the future...It is said that every U. S. city with a population of more than 100,000 has put up part of its public buildings with bonds marketed through Harris, Forbes & Co. As a logical development of its municipal business, the company has in more recent years become almost equally outstanding in the field of public utility finance.

== See also ==
- Harris, Hall & Co.
- Harris Bank
