= KVH =

KVH may refer to:

- Kendriya Vidyalaya Hebbal, a school in Bangalore, India
- KVH Co. Ltd., a Japanese company
- KVH Industries, an US company

== See also ==
- KHV (disambiguation)
