= KHV =

KHV may refer to:

- Khabarovsk Novy Airport (IATA code)
- Koi Herpes Virus, a species of virus causing disease in fish, and frogs

== See also ==
- KVH (disambiguation)
