= Harold Evensky =

American businessman and writer

- Born: September 9, 1942 (age 83); Memphis, Tennessee
- Education: Cornell University
- Occupations: Businessman, civil engineer, financial planner, writer

Harold Evensky (born September 9, 1942) is an American businessman, civil engineer, financial planner, and writer. He is a Certified Financial Planner (CFP), an Accredited Investment Fiduciary (AIF) and chairman of Evensky & Katz, a financial planning firm.

== Biography ==
Born in Memphis, Tennessee, Evensky moved to New Orleans with his family at age four. After earning a Bachelor of Civil Engineering and a Masters of Science from Cornell University, he worked as an engineer and builder in Louisiana, Ohio, and Florida, before becoming a financial adviser.

After some time as a vice president of investments for Bache & Co. (later acquired by Prudential Financial) and Drexel Burnham Lambert, he and his cousin Peter Brown opened up a private practice in 1986 under the name Evensky & Brown. In 1990, Chicago-based financial adviser Deena Katz merged her practice to form Evensky, Brown & Katz, where she served as company President. The new firm would go through a number of changes, including joining with partner Robert Levitt, parting with Levitt some years later, facing the retirement of co-founder Brown in the early 2000s, and relaunching the company as Evensky & Katz on its 20th anniversary in 2004.

== Financial planning ==
Evensky was dubbed the "Dean of Financial Planning" by Don Phillips, CEO of Morningstar.

Evensky has published books about his "two bucket" cash flow strategy and core and satellite strategy to the profession. He has addressed conferences throughout the United States, Canada, Europe, Australia, Asia, South Africa, and the United Kingdom. He has served as a contributing writer for Financial Advisor Magazine and The Asian Financial Planning Journal, research columnist for the Journal of Financial Planning, and a member of the editorial review board of the Journal of Financial Planning.

Evensky wrote the books Long Term Health Care (1990) and Wealth Management (1996). He has also co-authored The New Wealth Management (2011), a CFA Institute Investment Series text, and Hello Harold, a book for the public. He has also co-edited two books with his business partner and wife, Deena Katz, titled The Investment Think Tank: Theory, Strategy, and Practice For Advisers (2004) and Retirement Income Redesigned: Master Plans for Distribution (2006) where he also wrote a chapter for each.

Evensky has served on a number of different financial advisory boards, including as chairperson of the TIAA-CREF Institute Advisor Advisory Board, the International CFP Council, the CFP Board of Governors, the CFP Board of Examiners, and the CFP Board of Appeals, as well as a member of the national board of the International Association for Financial Planning (IAFP) and the Charles Schwab institutional advisory board and council. Evensky is a member of the Financial Planning Association, the Academy of Financial Services, the CFA Institute, and as an associate member of the American Bar Association and the AICPA. He is also a co-founder of the Alpha Group, an association of senior investment advisors and industry professionals.

== Later career ==
Evensky and his wife and partner Deena Katz opened a financial planning office in Lubbock, Texas, in May 2008.

Evensky also increased his involvement in the Personal Financial Planning (PFP) Program at Texas Tech University, where Katz had accepted a faculty position. Serving as an Adjunct Graduate Professor and then as Professor of Practice, he taught a behavioral finance course for the program, and a graduate level Wealth Management course since the fall of 2008.

== Accolades ==
In October 2018, Evensky received the P. Kemp Fain, Jr. Award, the pinnacle of recognition in the financial planning profession, honoring one exceptional individual who has made outstanding contributions to the financial planning profession. In October 2013, he received the Financial Planning Association's Heart of Financial Planning Award, granted jointly to Evensky and Katz. In granting the award, FPA cited Evensky and Katz's work "educating current and future advisers through teaching, internship coordination and writing books."

Evensky was named one of the five "Movers, Shakers & Decision Makers, The Most Influential People in the Financial Planning Profession" by Financial Planning Magazine. He is also cited by Accounting Today in their "Top Ten Names to Know in Financial Planning". Worth Magazine named Evensky as one of the top 100 Financial Advisers each year from 2002–2006.

Investment Advisor has named both him and Katz as members of The IA 25, a listing as the most influential people in finance on multiple occasions. The 2004 edition, appearing in May of that year, featured both of them on the cover. In January 2004, he appeared on the cover of Investment Advisor with Katz to speak about the changes to their firm, their personal life, and on the profession over the previous years.

In 2002, Evensky's paper titled "Changing Equity Premium Implications for Wealth Management Portfolio Design", won the Journal of Financial Planning's "Call for Papers" competition, and in 1999, Evensky was awarded the Dow Jones Investment Advisor Portfolio Management Award for Lifetime Achievement. His firm has pioneered the investment strategy of Core & Satellite for practitioners, an institutional strategy that uses passive management over "Core" positions and a blend of passive and active management over opportunity driven Satellite positions.
