= James P. Hynes =

British businessman (born 1948)

James P. Hynes (born 1948) is the founder of COLT Group, one of the United Kingdom's largest telecommunications businesses.

== Career ==
Brought up in the Bronx borough of New York and educated at Iona College and Adelphi University, Hynes initially worked at Chase Manhattan as a vice president after taking up posts at Continental Corporation, Bache & Co. and New York Telephone.

In 1989 Hynes became group managing director at Fidelity Capital, where he made a number of significant investments, including COLT Telecom Group, which he established in 1992. Under his leadership, first as CEO and then as chairman, COLT Telecom became one of the largest telecommunications businesses in the United Kingdom.

He also established MetroRED Telecom in South America and KVH Telecom in Japan.

Hynes retired from Fidelity Capital and from COLT Telecom in 1999.

In 2003 he co-founded another business, Neutral Tandem'Inc., where he served as CEO until 2006 and where he remains as chairman.

== Family ==
He is married to Anne Marie and has twin daughters Alanna and Katherine.

== Other interests ==
He is chairman of the board of trustees of Iona College.
