= A. G. Edwards =

Former American financial services holding company

A.G. Edwards
- Type: Finance and Insurance
- Founded: 1887
- Defunct: 2007
- Fate: Acquired by Wachovia (later merged with Wells Fargo)
- Successor: Wells Fargo Advisors (through Wachovia Securities)
- Headquarters: St. Louis, Missouri, USA
- Products: Financial services
- Owner: Wells Fargo
- Parent: Wachovia
- Website: agedwards.com

A.G. Edwards, Inc. was an American financial services holding company; its principal wholly owned subsidiary was A.G. Edwards & Sons, Inc., which operated as a full-service securities broker-dealer in the United States and Europe. The firm was acquired by Wachovia to be folded into Wachovia Securities; Wachovia was subsequently acquired by Wells Fargo, and the securities division was folded into Wells Fargo Advisors. The firm provided securities and commodities brokerage, investment banking, trust services, asset management, financial and retirement planning, private client services, investment management, and other related financial services to individual, governmental, and institutional clients.

A.G. Edwards was a member of the New York Stock Exchange and other major stock and commodities exchanges. The firm's global headquarters were located in the Downtown West area of St. Louis, Missouri. The company traded on the NYSE under the ticker symbol AGE.

== History ==
The company was founded in 1887 when Albert Gallatin Edwards and his son opened for business in St. Louis. It was the first St. Louis brokerage to handle transactions on the New York Stock Exchange, buying a seat on the NYSE in 1898.

Due to increased capital needs for its branch system, A.G. Edwards was among the first brokerage firms to go public. In November 1971, 445,000 shares of stock were offered to the public at $12 a share.

As of March 29, 2007, the company had over 740 locations in 50 states, the District of Columbia, London, and Geneva. The company served its clients through its branch-office networks staffed with 6,618 financial consultants, managing $374 billion in total client assets, and $44 billion in fee based accounts. During its fiscal year 2007, ending February 28, A.G. Edwards had net revenues of $3,110,500,000 and net earnings of $331,400,000.

On May 31, 2007, the company announced that it would be acquired by Wachovia Corporation in a $6.8 billion deal. On September 28, 2007, the company's shareholders voted in favor of the merger with Wachovia. The acquisition closed on October 1, 2007, and A.G. Edwards became a wholly owned subsidiary of Wachovia Corporation.

Following the merger, Wachovia moved the world headquarters of combined retail brokerage, Wachovia Securities, from Richmond, Virginia, to A.G. Edwards' previous headquarters in St. Louis, Missouri. Subsequently, Wachovia eliminated the A. G. Edwards brand in favor of Wachovia Securities.

On December 31, 2008, Wachovia Corporation was purchased by Wells Fargo & Co. after the bank was nearly taken over by the FDIC. Wachovia had purchased Golden West Financial and its subsidiary World Savings in mid-2007. The crash of subprime mortgages, which made up most of World Savings' nearly $200 billion mortgage portfolio, put significant strain on Wachovia and eventually caused its collapse. On July 1, 2009, Wachovia Securities was renamed Wells Fargo Advisors and Wells Fargo Investments, which included the former A.G. Edwards business lines.

== Controversy ==
In 2006 the firm agreed to pay $900,000 "to settle claims that it charged customers excessive account fees." In 2007 they paid "nearly $4 million" for a market-timing violation.

In 2008, the office of the Massachusetts Secretary of State launched a formal investigation into A.G. Edwards in response to a string of complaints from retirees of the former Boston Edison (now known as NSTAR). The investigation centered on a former A.G. Edwards broker, William "Buck" McHugh, who had targeted the Boston Edison retirees for their large severance packages beginning in the late 1990s. The complainants accused A.G. Edwards of failing to properly supervise McHugh as he allegedly steered millions of dollars into failed investments and embezzled funds from client accounts. Wachovia settled claims by the A.G Edwards customers in an agreement with the state.

== Benjamin Edwards III ==
Former CEO, Benjamin Edwards III, "who transformed A. G. Edwards, the St. Louis brokerage house founded by his great-grandfather, into the largest United States brokerage company based outside New York" died April 20, 2009, from prostate cancer at the age of 77, a couple of years after A.G. Edwards folded into Wachovia Securities.
