= Mark D. Schwartz =

Mark D. Schwartz (born San Francisco, California, 1953) is an American attorney in private practice known for his defense of whistle blowers and his handling of litigation involving the Sarbanes–Oxley Act. In addition to employment law and civil rights litigation, he also has handled prominent probate cases.

Schwartz practices entertainment and media law, as well as arranging the angel financing of theatrical productions. He has appeared as a professional actor in Off-Broadway productions while continuing to practice law.

== Education and background ==
A graduate of Swarthmore College, where he majored in political science, Schwartz served as legislative assistant to K. Leroy Irvis, the Majority Leader of the Pennsylvania House of Representatives, from 1975 through 1976, when he went on to law school. After earning his J.D. degree from the University of Pittsburgh Law School in 1979, Scwhartz eventually became an investment banker, rising to the position of first vice president of Prudential-Bache Securities's public-finance department in Philadelphia, Pennsylvania.

The public finance business, which involved the marketing of municipal bonds, was rife with corruption. He has appeared on Fox Business as a commentator on corruption in the municipal bond market.

== Prudential-Bache retaliation ==
In 1989, Schwartz complained about retaliation against employees who refused to make campaign contributions to political candidates favored by Prudential Bache Securities management. He was sacked as a "disgruntled employee" and subsequently blacklisted in the securities industry after filing a lawsuit against the National Association of Securities Dealers (NASD). An NASD arbitration panel never looked into his allegations, though a Securities and Exchange Commission (SEC) investigation substantiated his charges. As a result of the SEC investigation, the securities industry promised to curb abuses in the solicitation of political donations.

The Federal Election Commission subsequently fined Prudential for the shakedown of its employees. This experience gave Schwartz an appreciation for the predicament of whistle blowers, which is now the focus of his private, one-man "boutique" law firm in Bryn Mawr, Pennsylvania, along with corporate fraud.

== Cases ==
Schwartz was involved in litigation against Home Depot, defending Michael Davis, a whistleblower whom the company terminated. According to a May 18, 2007 story in the New York Post, Home Depot employees testified that employees were encouraged to routinely overcharge vendors for damaged or defective merchandise. It was revealed that Home Depot even established a quota of overcharges that employees had to meet.

His most high-profile case before Home Depot was the probate case involving the estate of the late violinist Isaac Stern. Representing Stern's grown children, Schwartz successfully sued estate executor William Moorhead, a friend of Stern's third wife, Linda Reynolds Stern, who had cut Stern's children by his second wife Vera out of his will due to her influence over Moorhead.

Schwartz also represented the late children's book author/illustrator Tasha Tudor in her successful fight to regain the copyrights to her early books, which had been purloined by her publisher. Currently, he represents Tudor's son Thomas Tudor, who serves as associate general counsel for international affairs for the United States Air Force, in the probate of her estate.

== Public service ==
As legislative assistant to the Pennsylvania House Majority Leader in the mid-1970s, Schwartz served as a speech writer and developed legislation. His responsibilities included the directorship of the House Rules Committee. Schwartz also was involved in administrative agency oversight.

In 1978, Schwartz was appointed by Pennsylvania Governor Milton Shapp (a Democrat) to the state's Juvenile Justice & Delinquency Prevention Advisory Committee of the Governor's Justice Commission. He was reappointed by Governor Dick Thornburgh, a Republican, and served on the committee until 1989.

He served as counsel to the chair of the credentials committee of the Democratic National Committee during the 1988 Democratic Presidential Convention.

In 1989, Scwhartz was appointed by the Speaker of the Pennsylvania House to be a commissioner of the Independent Regulatory Review Commission, an oversight body that approves the issuance of regulations by public agencies in the Commonwealth of Pennsylvania. He served as a commissioner through 1994.

In 1991, then Philadelphia mayor Edward Rendell named Schwartz to the Mayor's Transition Team and to the Mayor's Private Sector Task Force.

He was named a board member of the Philadelphia Crime Prevention Association's Finance Committee in 1992.

Despite the patronage of Edward Rendell, Schwartz has not shied away from criticizing him and his failure to reign in political corruption in Pennsylvania, as he did in a July 2009 op-ed piece on the conviction of former Pennsylvania State Senator Vince Fumo . Scwhartz had also been a visible opponent of the controversial project to relocate the Barnes Foundation art collection, a project funded by a grant from the Rendell Administration.

== Barnes Foundation Controversy ==
Schwartz has represented Montgomery County, Pennsylvania in its fight against the relocation of the art collection owned by the Barnes Foundation from Lower Merion, Pennsylvania to a proposed new museum in downtown Philadelphia. The Barnes Foundation is seeking to move the collection, which features paintings by Cézanne, Matisse and Renoir and is valued in excess of $2 billion, to a new Philadelphia-based museum in order to boost viewership and improve the Foundation's finances.

Under the terms of the will of the late Dr. Albert C. Barnes, who bought the paintings, the collection is supposed to remain in Lower Merion, a suburb of Philadelphia. The push to move the collection to Philadelphia has the support of Governor Edward Rendell. According to the New York Times, Barnes' will "stipulated that no picture in his collection could be lent, sold or moved from the walls of the galleries that he built for it in Merion...."

Schwartz has also represented the Friends of the Barnes Foundation, a group supporting maintaining the art collection in Lower Merion.

Schwartz' advocacy was memorialized in the popular documentary "ARt of the STeal" still available on various streaming services.

== Life beyond the law ==
Schwartz, who also is an actor, appeared Off-Broadway in a 2000 production of "Cruelties," a play about Truman Capote.
