= James Sykes (Continental Congress) =

American politician

Continental Congressman from Delaware
- In office February 22, 1777 – December 17, 1777

Personal details
- Born: 1725 New Castle County, Delaware Colony
- Died: April 4, 1792 (aged 66) Dover, Delaware
- Spouse: Agnes

James Sykes (1725 – April 4, 1792) was an American lawyer and politician from Dover, in Kent County, Delaware. He served in the Delaware General Assembly and was a Continental Congressman from Delaware.

== Early life and family ==
Sykes was born in 1725, probably in New Castle, Delaware. He married Agnes Bell and had eight children: James, Stephen, George, Nathaniel, Ann, Harriet, Lucy Matilda, and Mary. They lived in Dover, Delaware, and were members of Christ Episcopal Church.

== Political career ==
Sykes served as a lieutenant under Caesar Rodney in the Dover militia in 1756. In 1776 he was a delegate to the Delaware State Constitutional Convention held at Dover. From November 7, 1776, until January 10, 1777, Sykes served on the Council of Safety, a body which was appointed to act as the state's executive until the Delaware General Assembly was able to choose the state's first President and Privy Council. He served in the Continental Congress most of 1777. Also in 1777, Sykes was appointed Kent County Clerk of the Peace and Kent County Prothonotary. He served in these posts for the remainder of his life. Sykes served on the state's Privy Council in 1780, and in the state's second Constitutional Convention in 1792 until his death. He was appointed Judge of the High Court of Errors and Appeals of Delaware in 1792 and served until his death later that year.

== Death and legacy ==
Sykes died in Dover, Delaware, on April 4, 1792, and is buried at Christ Episcopal Church there. His son, James Sykes Jr., served as Governor of Delaware, and his great-grandson George served as a Major General in the American Civil War.

== Almanac ==
From 1776 until 1792 Delaware elections were held on the first day of October of the year noted. Terms for members of the General Assembly began on the twentieth day of October. Members of the Legislative Council had a term of three years. Three State Councilmen were elected, at large, from each county.

Public offices
Office	Type	Location	Elected	Term began	Term ended	notes
Delegate	Convention	Dover		August 27, 1776	September 20, 1776	State Constitution
Council of Safety	Legislature	New Castle		November 7, 1776	January 10, 1777	
State Council	Legislature	New Castle	1776	October 28, 1776	October 20, 1777	
Delegate	Legislature	Philadelphia		February 22, 1777	December 17, 1777	Continental Congress
Delegate	Convention	Dover	1791	November 1791	April 4, 1792	State Constitution
