= Stuart School of Business =

Business school at the Illinois Institute of Technology in Chicago, Illinois

Coordinates: 41°49′53.0″N 88°37′38.0″W

- Type: Private
- Established: 1969 with a bequest from Harold L. Stuart
- Dean: Rich Klein
- Faculty: Student/Faculty ratio: 20:1
- Students: 1508 (2024)
- Location: Chicago, Illinois, USA
- Campus: Urban
- Website: iit.edu/stuart

The Stuart School of Business is the business school of the Illinois Institute of Technology in Chicago, Illinois, United States.

The school offers undergraduate courses at the Mies Campus and graduate courses at Illinois Tech's Conviser Law Center in Downtown Chicago.

== History ==
Business education at Illinois Tech dates back to the late 1890s, with courses in “Family and Consumer Science,” including “Home Economics” and “Household Management,” being offered by the Lewis Institute, Stuart's original home, and the Institute's subsequent formation of the university's Department of Business and Economics in 1926.

After the Lewis Institute and Armour Institute merged to form Illinois Institute of Technology, the Department of Business and Economics continued the work of Philip D. Armour, a merchant financier, Julia A. Beveridge, a librarian turned public administrator, Frank W. Gunsaulus, a preacher in the 1880s, and, with a gift from Lewis Institute alum Harold Leonard Stuart, became the Stuart School of Business. The school's namesake, Harold L. Stuart, was an American financier in the first half of the 20th century, and his Chicago investment bank played a role in establishing the city as a global financial hub. Stuart was also responsible for some of the earliest financing that established Chicago's train transportation network, now part of the Chicago Transit Authority (CTA).

Over 125 years, beginning with Julia A. Beveridge and George N. Carman, early leaders of the Lewis Institute, as well as scholarly works by Herb A. Simon (author of Administrative Behavior, later awarded the Nobel Prize in Economics), Karl Menger (developer of the St. Petersburg paradox in economics), and Abe Sklar (developer of the Copula in financial modeling), the Stuart School of Business has evolved to provide education centered around management/administration, finance, and analytics. Illinois Tech has offered educational programs in public administration since the 1940s with Simon's groundbreaking, interdisciplinary work, and has awarded the Master of Public Administration (M.P.A.) degree, the most widely recognized professional credential, since the mid-1960s. In 1990, Stuart established quantitative finance as an academic discipline, with the world's first postgraduate Master's program in Financial Markets and Trading. In 2023, Stuart celebrated the 10-year anniversary of its Marketing Analytics program and announced the rechristening of two additional analytics-focused programs, the Master of Science in Sustainability Management and Analytics and Chicago's only part-time Ph.D. program in Management Science and Analytics.

Stuart's mission states: “The Stuart School of Business at Illinois Institute of Technology bridges business and technology by combining rigorous, practical, and interdisciplinary research and education.” Today, Stuart offers academic programs (many STEM-designated) in the disciplines of business, economics, finance, analytics, marketing, management, and public administration paired with co-curricular leadership, mentorship, entrepreneurship, and experiential learning opportunities focused on student development and success that have positive societal impact and connect individuals to the business community.

== Historical timelines ==
- 1898 - Instruction in “Family and Consumer Science” offered by the Lewis Institute
- 1926 - The Department of Business and Economics is established at the Lewis Institute
- 1940 - The Lewis Institute and the Armour Institute of Technology merge to form Illinois Institute of Technology
- 1941 - The Bachelor of Science in Business and Economics is offered
- 1947 - Illinois Tech faculty member Herb Simon publishes “Administrative Behavior,” receives the Nobel Memorial Prize in Economic Sciences in 1978
- 1948 - The Master of Science in Business and Economics and the Master of Science in Business and Engineering Administration are offered
- 1950 - PhD in Business and Economics is offered
- 1959 - Illinois Tech faculty member Abe Sklar invents the Copula in probability theory, the basis of modern copula in finance modeling
- 1961 - The MBA is offered
- 1960 - Illinois Tech faculty member Karl Menger publishes some of his key works in economics
- 1969 - The Department of Business and Economics is elevated to the Stuart School of Business
- 1972 - The Bachelor of Science and Master of Science in Economics are offered
- 1977 - The Departments of Management, Economics, Finance, and Industrial and Systems Engineering are merged into the Stuart School of Business
- 1980 - Part-time MBA program is first offered
- 1990 - World's first MS Finance program developed, and officially launches soon after as MS Financial Markets and Trading
- 1992 - Stuart School of Business establishes a second location in downtown Chicago
- 1995 - MS Sustainability Analytics and Management was founded (originally as Environmental Management)
- 1998 - MS Marketing Analytics was founded (originally as Marketing Communications)
- 1999 - Stuart achieves accreditation from AACSB, the Association to Advance Collegiate Schools of Business
- 2009 - Master of Public Administration program moves into Stuart (from the College of Science and Letters)
- 2017 - Financial Markets Research Lab opens
- 2022 - The MBA in Business Analytics is offered
- 2023 - Center for Sports Innovation opens. New Bachelor of Science majors offered include Business and Engineering, Business and Psychology, Business and Information Technology, Economics and Policy, Economics and Cybersecurity, and Economics and Business Analytics. New Master of Science programs offered include Project Management, Financial Economics, and MBA in Quantitative Finance

== Accreditation ==
Stuart is accredited by the Association to Advance Collegiate Schools of Business (AACSB). As part of the Illinois Institute of Technology, Stuart is also accredited by the Higher Learning Commission (HLC).

== Rankings ==
- Ranked 17th in the United States among best master's of management programs by TFE Times (2023) for the Master of Science in Management Science program.
- Ranked 23rd in the U.S. among best master's of marketing programs by TFE Times (2023) for the Master of Science in Marketing Analytics program.
- Ranked 24th in the U.S. by TFE Times (2023) for the Master of Science in Finance program.
- Ranked in the Global Top 100 for the Master of Business Administration program by the Aspen Institute.
- Included in The Princeton Review's Best Business Schools listing for 2024.

== Awards ==
Student teams from Stuart School of Business have participated in business competitions against teams from other universities from around the world.

- Stuart teams have competed in the McGill International Portfolio Challenge semifinals in each of the eight years that the contest has been held, with the 2017 and 2019 teams advancing to the finals.
- Teams with Stuart students have won the CFA Institute Research Challenge’s Chicago local competition in nine times. Three of those teams advanced to the Americas Region Finals, with one going on to compete in the global finals.
- 2022 Stuart team Best Hawk placed sixth out of 498 teams globally and third among 320 teams from the U.S. in the CME Group University Trading Challenge.
- SSB Hawks, a team of three Stuart students in the M.S. in Marketing Analytics program, achieved the ninth-highest score in the 2023 Curiosity Cup, which drew 52 teams from 16 countries.
- 2021 Stuart team and 2020 Stuart team recognized as Top Marketers in the Google Online Marketing Challenge.

== Departments and research centers ==
- Center for Advancing Corporate Performance
- Center for Strategic Finance
- Center for Sports Innovation

== Academics ==
Stuart School of Business offers bachelor's, master's, doctoral, non-degree, and graduate certificate programs in the areas of economics, finance, analytics, marketing, business, project management, public administration, and management. Stuart also offers combined and dual degrees with Illinois Tech's Chicago-Kent College of Law, IIT Institute of Design, College of Computing, Lewis College of Science and Letters, and Armour College of Engineering.

* denotes programs that are STEM-designated

=== Undergraduate Programs ===
- Business Administration (B.S.)
- Finance (B.S.) *
- Financial Economics (B.S.) *
- Marketing Analytics (B.S.) *
- Business and Engineering (B.S.)
- Business and Information Technology (B.S.)
- Business and Psychology (B.S.)
- Game Production Management (B.S.)
- Economics and Policy (B.S.)
- Business Analytics (B.S.)
- Business and Cybersecurity (B.S.)
- Economics and Data Science (B.S.)
- Business Administration (B.S.)/Computer Information Systems (B.S.) * (dual degree)
- Business Administration (B.S.)/Information Technology and Management (B.A.C.) * (dual degree)

=== Master’s Programs ===
- Business Administration (M.B.A.)
- Business Administration (Online M.B.A.)
- Business Analytics (M.B.A.) *
- Technological Entrepreneurship (M.B.A)
- Business Analytics (M.S.)
- Finance (M.S.) *
- Financial Economics (M.S.) *
- Management (M.A.S.)
- Management Science and Analytics (M.S.) *
- Marketing Analytics (M.S.) *
- Project Management (M.S.) *
- Public Administration (M.P.A.)
- Public Administration in Analytics (M.P.A.)
- Sustainability Analytics and Management (M.S.) *
- Technological Entrepreneurship (M.A.S.)

=== Doctoral Programs ===
- Finance (Ph.D.)
- Management Science and Analytics (Ph.D.)

=== Other Programs ===
- Accelerated Master's—Complete both a bachelor's and a master's in as few as five years
- Graduate Dual Degrees—Earn two graduate degrees with fewer credits required: business plus computing, business plus design, business plus law, business plus psychology, or an M.B.A. plus a specialized business master's
- Certificate Programs—Academic credentials consisting of three or four classes in a focused area

== Noteworthy alumni ==
- John Calamos ('65 MBA), Founder, Chairman, and Global Chief Investment Officer, Calamos Investments
- Carl S. Spetzler ('63 BS ChE, '65 MBA, '68 PhD), CEO Strategic Decisions Group
- Ellen Jordan (‘79 PSYC, ‘81 MBA), CEO & Queen Bean at Global Grounds, LLC; President and Founder, America's Food Technologies, Inc
- Lucia "Rita" Fiumara (‘96 MBA), Senior Vice President, UBS Financial Services, Inc.
- Linxin Wen (‘15 MPA), CEO and co-founder, Chowbus
- Kaiwei Tang (‘06 MBA), CEO and co-founder, Light, maker of the Light Phone
