= Deborah DeHaas =

Deborah "Deb" DeHaas is the Vice Chairman, Chief Inclusion Officer & National Managing Partner of Deloitte, and the first woman to be named Midwest managing partner of Deloitte. She was the first woman Chairman of the Board of Chicagoland Chamber of Commerce, and she serves as a trustee of Northwestern University and the Museum of Science and Industry (Chicago). DeHaas is known for her efforts toward diversity and inclusion in the workplace.

== Personal life ==
DeHaas grew up in Washington, Pennsylvania. Her mother was the only woman from the accounting program to graduate from University of Pittsburgh in 1951, and worked in Gulf Oil's accounting department while DeHaas's father went to medical school. After DeHaas's father became an obstetrician, her mother left accounting but became involved in local affairs. She started the Head Start program in Washington, and was the first woman on the local city council. DeHaas considers her mother to be a great influence in her career.

DeHaas is married to Dave Underwood, who she met at Arthur Andersen. They have three sons.

== Career ==
DeHaas attended Duke University and graduated with a Bachelor's degree in management science and accounting in 1981. Also, in 1981, DeHaas joined the accounting firm Arthur Andersen as a staff member, then a senior auditor. In 1985, DeHaas rose to manager; in 1993, she became a partner; and in 1999, she became a managing partner of Arthur Andersen.

When Arthur Andersen folded in 2002, DeHaas chose to join Deloitte because she admired the culture of fostering diversity and inclusion. At Deloitte, she helped lead the initiative in which Deloitte hired 950 former Andersen employees. According to Crain's Chicago Business, at Deloitte, DeHaas "oversees the region's efforts to recruit and promote women and minorities, mentors employees and meets with the firm's national senior management to set performance targets and plan new strategies."

DeHaas is heavily civically involved. She is on the boards of Chicagoland Chamber of Commerce, Northwestern University, the Executives' Club of Chicago, the Museum of Science and Industry, United Way of Metropolitan Chicago, WTTW, and Partnership for a Healthier America. DeHaas is a director of World Business Chicago and After School Matters, Inc. She is the treasurer and a trustee of the Northlight Theatre. She was the co-chair of fundraising for Chicago's bid to host the 2016 Olympics.

== Awards ==
DeHaas is a member of the Junior Achievement Chicago Business Hall of Fame, and received the 2010 City Year Chicago Ripples of Hope Award, the American Red Cross of Greater Chicago 2008 Heritage Award, and the YWCA’s 2006 Outstanding Women’s Leaders Award for Community Leadership. DeHaas was the first Chicago recipient of the Athena Award in 2005. She received the Chicagoland Chamber of Commerce 2004 Daniel H. Burnham Award, the Anti-Defamation League 2004 Women of Achievement Award, and the 2003 United Way Campaign Chair Award.

DeHaas was among the “100 Most Powerful Chicagoans” named in 2012 by Chicago magazine, in addition to the “100 Women of Influence 2013” by Today’s Chicago Woman. DeHaas was named one of Accounting Today’s “Top 100 Most Influential” list in 2013 and 2014. She was included in the 2015 and 2016 NACD Directorship 100.
