= BMO Tower (Chicago) =

Office skyscraper in Chicago, Illinois

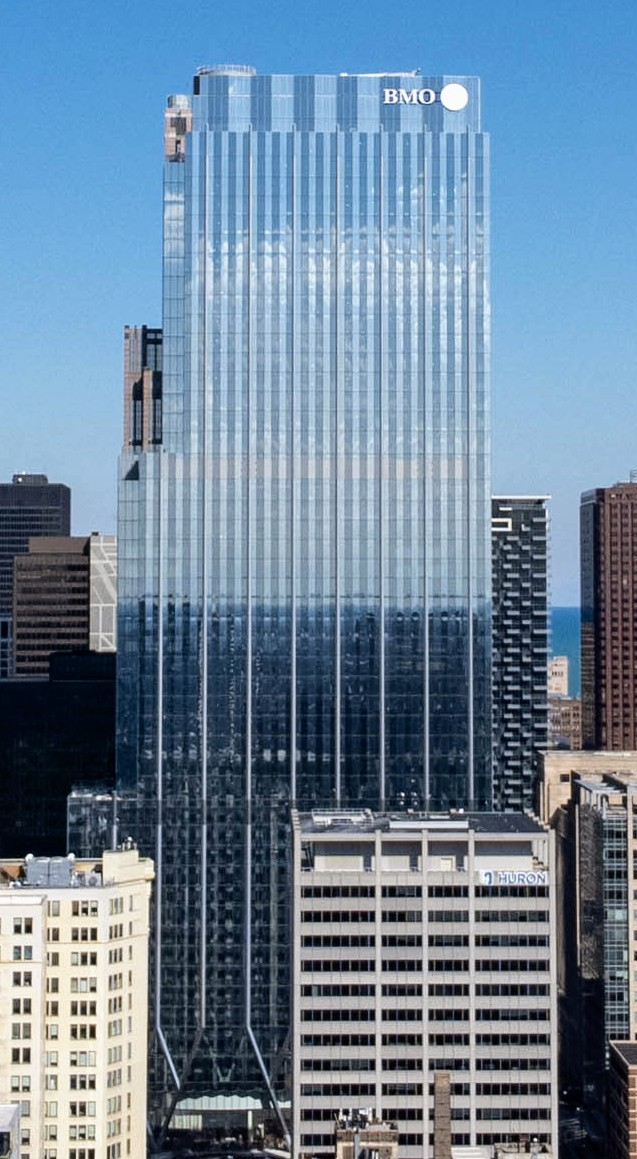
- BMO Tower.
- Interactive map of the BMO Tower area
- Former names: Union Station Tower

General information
- Status: Completed
- Type: Office
- Location: 320 S. Canal Street; Chicago, Illinois 60606; United States
- Coordinates: 41°52′38″N 87°38′24″W
- Current tenants: Bank of Montreal
- Construction started: 2019
- Completed: 2022
- Owner: Riverside Investment & Development Company; Convexity Properties

Height
- Architectural: 727 ft (222 m)

Technical details
- Floor count: 51
- Floor area: 1,500,000 sq ft (140,000 m^{2})

Design and construction
- Architect: Goettsch Partners
- Main contractor: Clark Construction

Website
- https://320southcanal.com/

The BMO Tower, also known as 320 South Canal, is a 51-story, 727-foot-high (222 m) skyscraper in the West Loop neighborhood of Chicago, Illinois, and sits directly south of the Union Station rail terminal. When completed, it became the 24th-tallest building in Chicago, and the tallest to the west of Canal Street. The building, designed by Goettsch Partners and consulted by Magnusson Klemencic Associates, added 1,500,000 square feet (140,000 m^{2}) of office space to the city.

The project is managed by Convexity Properties and Riverside Investment and Development. The building serves as the headquarters for BMO Bank, the U.S. commercial banking subsidiary of the Bank of Montreal, and was opened in Spring 2022.

== Development and construction ==
Prior to construction, the site was the location of an Amtrak-owned parking lot. Plans for the development were announced in early 2019, and construction began later that year in December. The designs for the tower included terraced setbacks and V-shaped structural frames. Plans also called for a 1.5-acre public park, and a renovation of the upper floors of the Union Station into a 400-room hotel.

In August 2020, the structure began vertical construction. In April 2021, the final beam of the structure was laid at a ceremony attended by Chicago Mayor Lori Lightfoot.

== See also ==
- List of tallest buildings in Chicago
