= George Sykes =

United States Army officer (1822–1880)

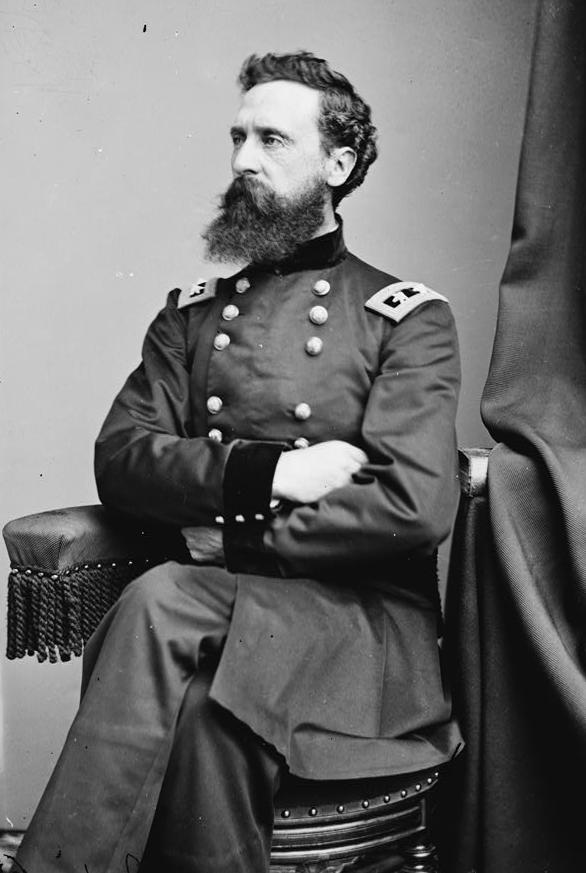
- General George Sykes
- Born: October 9, 1822; Dover, Delaware, US
- Died: February 8, 1880 (aged 57); Fort Brown, Texas, US
- Burial place: West Point Cemetery; West Point, New York
- Military career
- Allegiance: United States of America; Union
- Branch: United States Army; Union Army
- Service years: 1842–1880
- Rank: Major general (Civil War); Colonel (Post Civil War)
- Nicknames: Tardy George; Slow Trot Sykes
- Commands: V Corps; 20th U.S. Infantry Regiment
- Conflicts: Second Seminole War; Mexican–American War; American Civil War

George Sykes (October 9, 1822 – February 8, 1880) was a career United States Army officer and a Union general during the American Civil War.

He graduated from the United States Military Academy in 1842, then served in numerous conflicts, including the Second Seminole War and the Mexican–American War. During the Civil War, he was appointed commander of the 2nd Division of the V Corps of the Army of the Potomac during the Peninsula Campaign of 1862, and continued in that role through the Second Battle of Bull Run, the Battle of Antietam, the Battle of Fredericksburg, and the Battle of Chancellorsville.

Sykes assumed command of the V Corps on June 28, 1863, after Major General George Meade was promoted to command the entire army. Sykes's Corps fought with distinction on the second day of the Battle of Gettysburg on July 2. He was relieved from command for medical reasons on March 23, 1864, and sent to duty in Kansas. Sykes remained in the army after the war and died in 1880.

== Early life ==
Sykes was born in Dover, Delaware. He graduated from the United States Military Academy in 1842 and graduated 39th out of 56 cadets. It was during his time as cadet that he acquired the nicknames "Tardy George" and "Slow Trot" Sykes. He was commissioned as a brevet second lieutenant in the 3rd U.S. Infantry. He served in the Second Seminole War, Mexican–American War, and numerous other conflicts.

Sykes was brevetted as a captain for actions at the Battle of Cerro Gordo. By virtue of his service in the Mexican War, Sykes became a member of the Aztec Club of 1847. Sykes continued his frontier service and Indian fighting, mainly in New Mexico, and was promoted to full captain in 1855. His final peacetime station was Fort Clark, Texas.

== Civil War ==
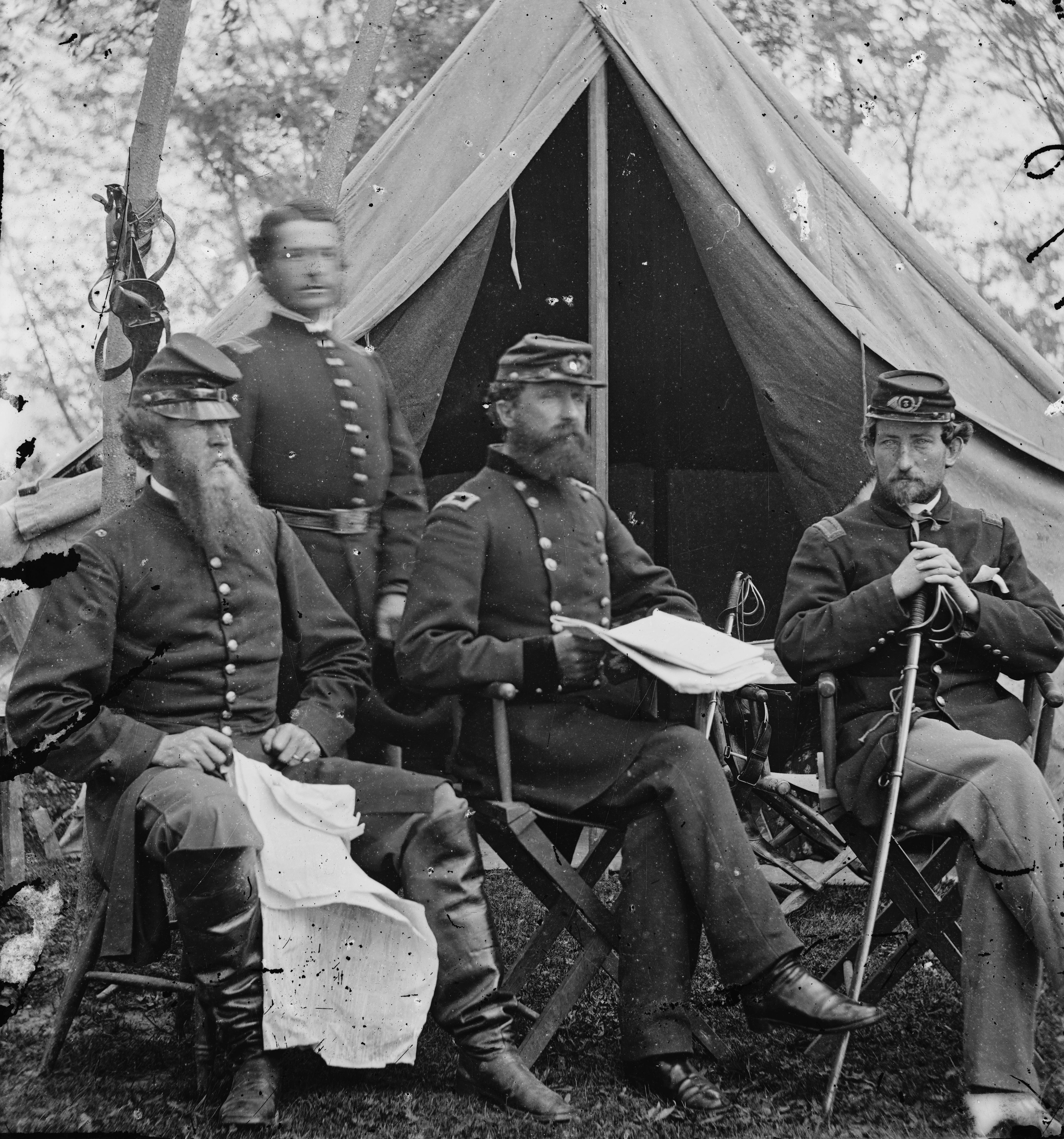
General Sykes and his staff

At the outbreak of the Civil War, Sykes was assigned as a major in the new 14th U.S. Infantry. At the First Battle of Bull Run, he commanded the Regular Infantry Battalion, a collection of eight regular army companies from different regiments, the only regulars on the field. Sykes received command of a brigade of regulars after Bull Run, and was promoted to brigadier general of volunteers on September 28. He led his regulars in the Peninsula Campaign and rose to division command in May 1862 in the new V Corps. His men, who often referred to themselves as "Sykes' Regulars", distinguished themselves defending their position at Gaines' Mill during the Seven Days Battles, before the Union line broke elsewhere.

Sykes was the only division commander in the Army of the Potomac not rewarded with a promotion to major general after the Seven Days Battles. He continued to lead his division at Second Bull Run, Antietam, and Fredericksburg, although it was not heavily engaged in the latter two battles. At Chancellorsville, his regulars led the advance into the Confederate rear at the start of the battle. Sykes' division engaged Maj. Gen. Lafayette McLaws' division on the Orange Turnpike.

Sykes' division was forced to retreat after being attacked on the right flank by Maj. Gen. Robert E. Rodes' division, then the army commander, Maj. Gen. Joseph Hooker, nervously recalled his advance to a defensive position; and Sykes' men were not engaged for the remainder of the campaign. Sykes finally received a promotion to major general of volunteers on November 29, 1862. When corps commander Maj. Gen. George Meade was promoted to lead the Army of the Potomac on June 28, 1863, Sykes assumed command of the V Corps.

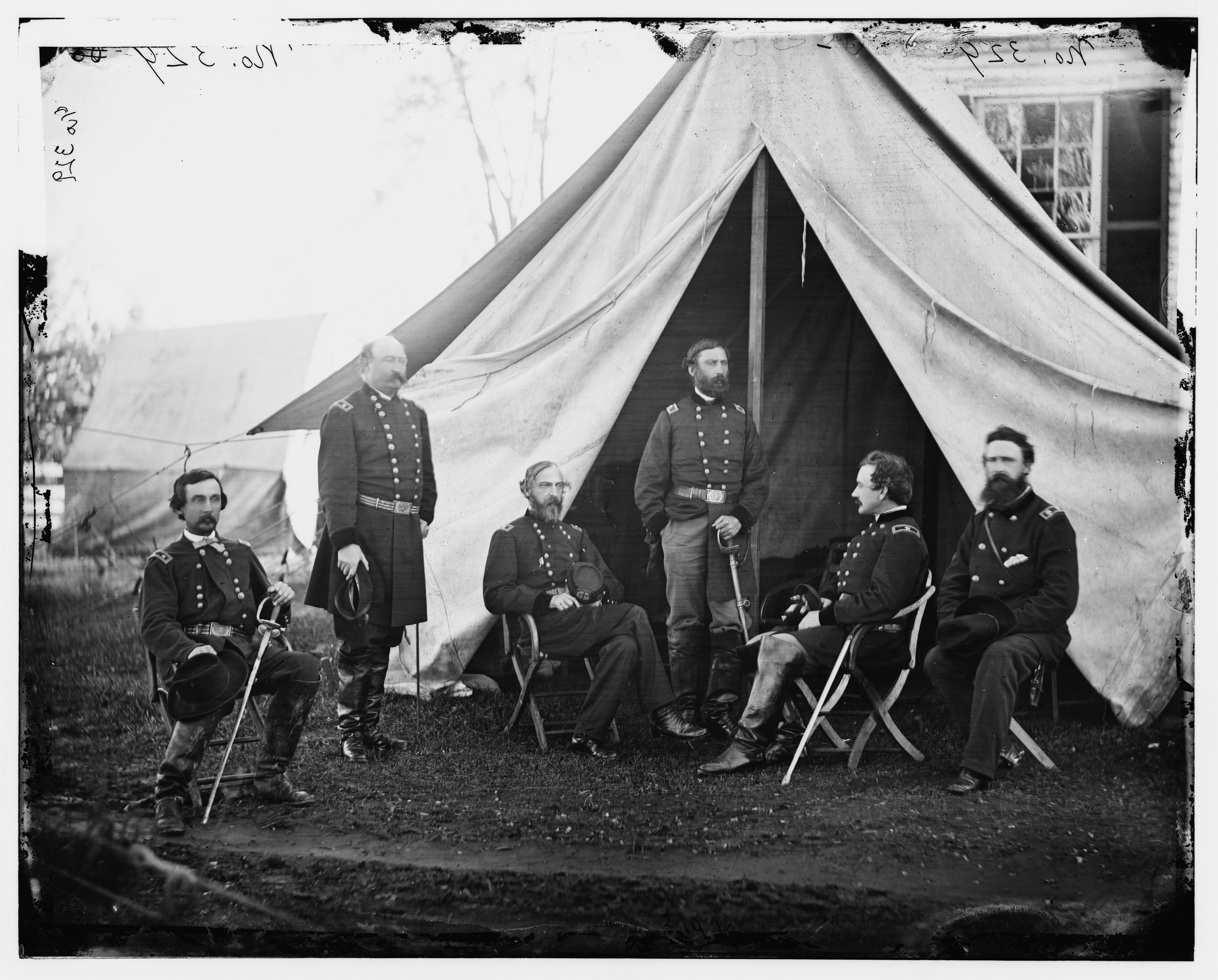
Commanders of the Army of the Potomac: Gouverneur K. Warren, William H. French, George G. Meade, Henry J. Hunt, Andrew A. Humphreys and George Sykes in September 1863

At the Battle of Gettysburg, Sykes' corps fought in support of the beleaguered III Corps on the Union left flank. In his 1st Division (Brig. Gen. James Barnes), the fabled defense of Little Round Top was led by brigade commander Col. Strong Vincent and the 20th Maine Infantry under Col. Joshua Lawrence Chamberlain. His 3rd Division, the Pennsylvania Reserves, led by Brig. Gen. Samuel W. Crawford, attacked from Little Round Top, drove the Confederates across the "Valley of Death" and ended the deadly fighting in the Wheatfield.

On October 16, 1863, Sykes was promoted to lieutenant colonel in the regular army.

Sykes and his V Corps served in the Bristoe Campaign and in the Mine Run Campaign in the fall and winter of 1863. In March 1864, upon recommendation from the V Corps medical director due to severe sciatica, Sykes was relieved of command of the V Corps and sent to uneventful duty in the Department of Kansas. During Price's Raid in 1864, he was replaced with James G. Blunt.

== Postbellum career ==
After the war, Sykes was mustered out of the volunteer service and returned to serve in the regular army in 1866. As lieutenant colonel, he served in the 5th U.S. Infantry. Sykes was promoted to colonel on January 12, 1868 and received command of the 20th U.S. Infantry. He commanded at a number of duty stations from Minnesota to Texas until he died while on duty in Texas at Fort Brown on February 8, 1880, at age 57. He was interred in West Point Cemetery, West Point, New York.

His grandson, Macrae Sykes, was a financier and a former chairman of the American Stock Exchange.

== See also ==
- List of American Civil War generals (Union)

== Notes ==
Military offices
Preceded by Charles Griffin	Commander of the Fifth Army Corps; February 5, 1863 – February 5, 1863	Succeeded by George Meade
Preceded by George Meade	Commander of the Fifth Army Corps; June 28, 1863 – October 7, 1863	Succeeded by Samuel W. Crawford
Preceded by Samuel W. Crawford	Commander of the Fifth Army Corps; October 15, 1863 – March 23, 1864	Succeeded by Gouverneur K. Warren
