= Prudential Securities =

American financial services company

- Formerly: Prudential Securities Incorporated
- Type: Subsidiary
- Industry: Investment banking
- Predecessor: Bache & Co., Prudential-Bache Securities
- Founded: 1981
- Defunct: 2003
- Fate: Acquired by Wachovia Corporation to form Wachovia Securities
- Successor: Wachovia Securities and Jefferies Bache
- Headquarters: New York, New York, United States
- Products: Financial services
- Parent: Prudential Financial

Prudential Securities, formerly known as Prudential Securities Incorporated (PSI), was an American financial services arm of the insurer, Prudential Financial. In 2003, Prudential Securities was merged into Wachovia Securities, a division of Wachovia Bank.

== History ==
Prudential Securities traces its origins to the founding of the Leopold Cahn & Co. brokerage and investment bank in 1879. In 1891, the firm was reorganized as J.S. Bache & Co. after Jules Bache was brought into the partnership.

In 1974, Bache merged with Halsey, Stuart & Co., a Chicago-based investment bank founded in 1911. In 1952, Halsey, Stuart made headlines when its managing partner, Harold L. Stuart, testified before the U.S. Supreme Court for the government's antitrust case against Morgan Stanley and 16 other major investment banks. The fact that Halsey, Stuart was a significant investment banking firm, at the top of the IPO league tables in 1951 led some observers to suspect that they had provoked the government's antitrust suit.

Prudential-Bache logo, ca. 1984

In 1981, the company (then called Bache Halsey Stuart Shields) was acquired by Prudential Financial and renamed Prudential-Bache Securities. Prudential dropped the usage of the Bache name in 1991, renaming the division Prudential Securities.

In 1989, the firm acquired branch offices, client accounts and related assets from Thomson McKinnon when a deal to purchase Thompson McKinnon fell through a top 20 brokerage and investment banking firm.

In 1999, Prudential acquired Volpe Brown Whelan & Company.

=== Investor fraud ===
During the 1980s and 1990s, Prudential Securities Incorporated, was investigated by the Securities and Exchange Commission (SEC) for suspected fraud. During the investigation, it was found that PSI had defrauded investors of close to $8 billion, the largest fraud found by the SEC in US history to that point. The SEC charged that Prudential allowed rogue executives to cheat customers on a large scale and blithely ignored a 1986 SEC order to overhaul its internal enforcement of securities laws. In all, some 400,000 individual investors lost money on the deals.

Prudential Financial eventually settled with investors for $330 million in 1993. Prudential said it would repay customers across the U.S. who lost money on the company's limited partnerships in the 1980s. In addition, the firm was required to pay another $41 million in fines. The settlement also resolved investigations of the firm by the National Association of Securities Dealers and 49 states, including California, where 52,000 investors lost money in Prudential limited partnerships. Further investigation was conducted by the SEC into the executives of the company to determine the extent of the fraud.

=== Merger with Wachovia ===
Prudential Financial combined its retail brokerage in a joint venture with Wachovia to form Wachovia Securities LLC on July 1, 2003. Wachovia purchased 62% of the joint venture, while Prudential retained the remaining 38%. At the time, the new firm had client assets of $532.1 billion, making it the nation's third largest full service retail brokerage firm based on assets. Prudential, which had been looking to sell its brokerage division, sought to use the joint venture's larger brokerage network to market its insurance products, while Wachovia sought to expand its investment banking business through the combination.

=== Remaining Business ===
Following the joint venture with Wachovia, Prudential Financial retained the commodities and financial derivatives businesses. These businesses did not use the Bache name. However, in January 2003, Prudential Financial rebranded the two units under the Bache name, forming Prudential Bache. This unit was sold to Jefferies & Company parent Jefferies Group in 2011.

== See also ==
- Bache & Co.
- Halsey, Stuart & Co.
