= Norman Wait Harris =

American banker (1846–1916)

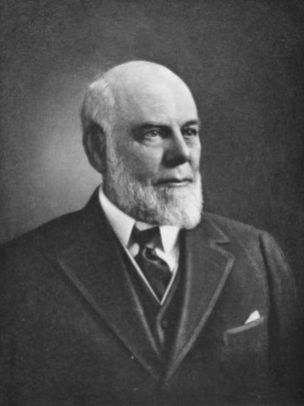
- Born: August 15, 1846; Becket, Massachusetts, US
- Died: July 15, 1916 (aged 69); Lake Geneva, Wisconsin, US
- Burial place: Rosehill Cemetery
- Education: Westfield Academy (1863)
- Years active: 1867–1916
- Employers: N.W. Harris & Co.; Harris Trust & Savings Bank; Harris, Forbes & Co.
- Known for: Banker, Philanthropist

Norman Wait Harris (August 15, 1846 – July 15, 1916) was an American banker. He founded Chicago-based N.W. Harris & Co., the predecessor of Harris Bank as well as its affiliate Harris, Forbes & Co. and later Harris, Hall & Co.

== Biography ==
Harris was born in Berkshire County, Massachusetts, in 1846, to Nathan Wait Harris and C. Emeline Wadsworth Harris. Harris was educated at Westfield Academy, graduating at age 17 to pursue a career in business. In 1867, at age 21, Harris joined the Union Central Life Insurance Company of Cincinnati, which he helped to found, as secretary.

In 1882, Harris established N.W. Harris & Co., a banking firm that bore his name. The firm, initially based in Chicago, would later open offices in New York City and Boston. In 1907, Harris reorganized his banking business, founding the Harris Trust and Savings Bank, based in Chicago and Harris, Forbes & Co. based in New York.

In 1916, during a tour of Asia, Harris suffered a heart attack in Japan. He arrived in Seattle in May 1916, where he remained briefly before returning home. Harris died just two months later in July 1916 at his summer home in Lake Geneva, Wisconsin.

He is interred at Rosehill Cemetery in Chicago.

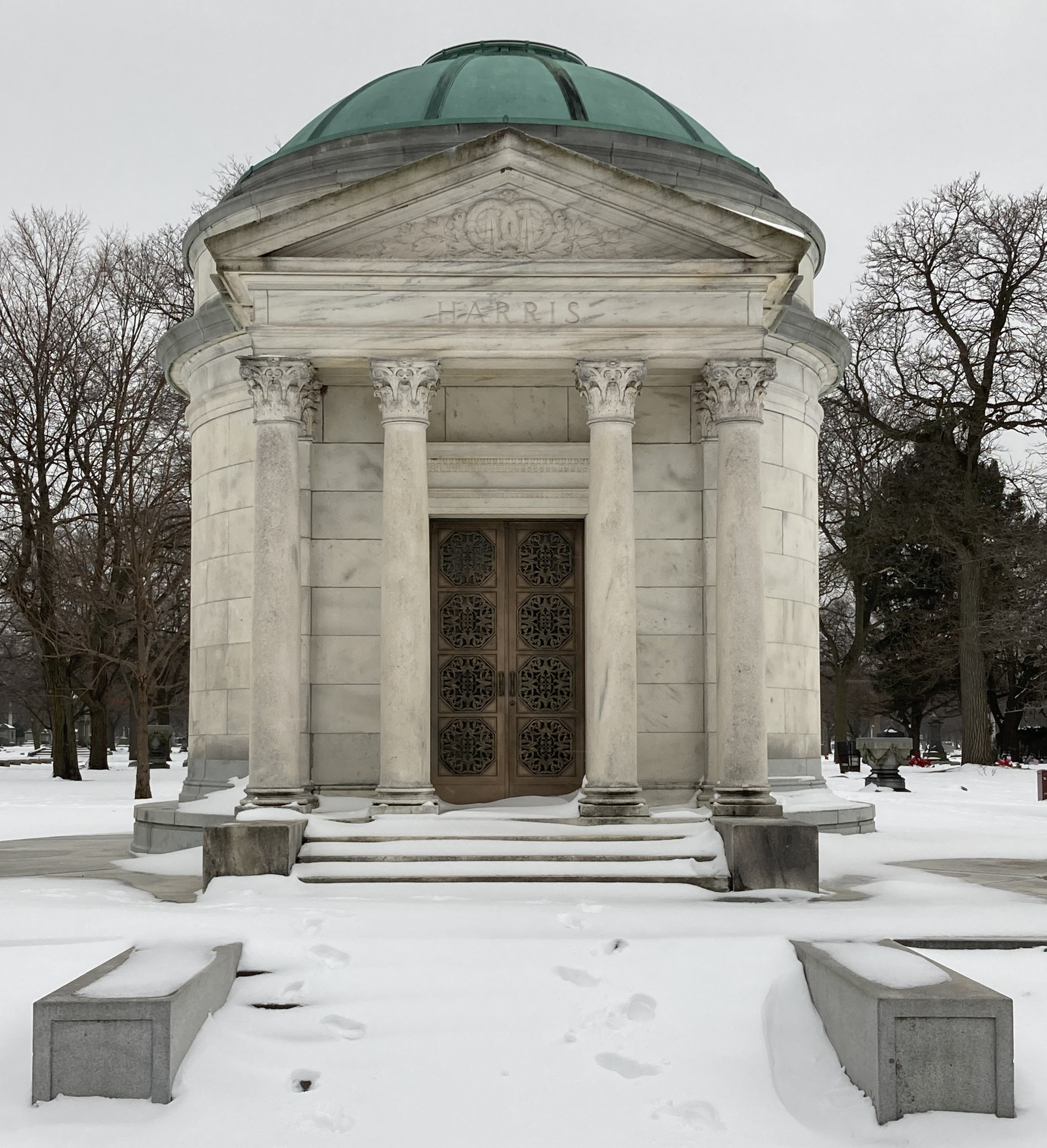
Harris mausoleum at Rosehill Cemetery

== Philanthropy ==
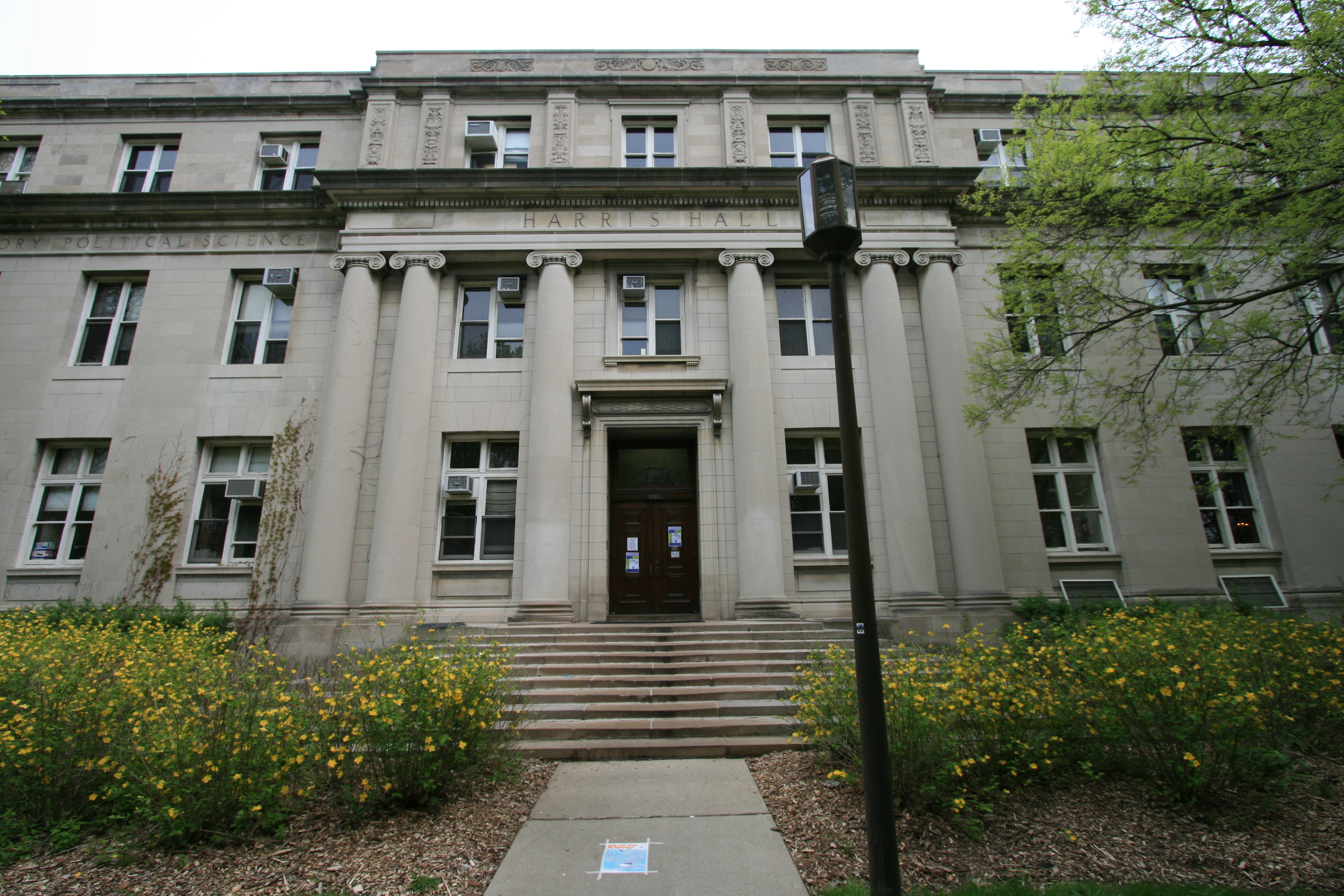
Harris Hall at Northwestern University

In his later years, Harris was a philanthropist supporting a wide range of institutions, particularly in Chicago. Harris made substantial gifts to the University of Chicago, which in 1924 endowed an "Institute of Politics"; the Field Museum, where a $250,000 gift was used to fund a public school expansion; and the YMCA. In 1913, Harris gave $250,000 to Northwestern University for the construction of Harris Hall of Political Science and History (today known as Harris Hall), which is located at the front gate of the University.

Harris also gave a substantial gift to the Chicago Training School for Home and Foreign Missions, the largest training school of its kind for Methodist missionaries in the United States. Harris, who was actively involved with the Methodist Episcopal Church, donated the land for the construction of its main campus and chapel.
