= KVH Co. Ltd. =

KVH Co., Ltd.
- Company type: Private
- Industry: Telecommunications IT services
- Founded: April 2, 1999
- Headquarters: Tamachi Eki-Mae Building, Tokyo, Japan
- Key people: Edward Higase (President, CEO, and Representative Director) Mr. Quy Nguyen (Chief Financial Officer), Mr. Kenji Hioki (Chief Operating Officer)
- Services: Data communications Fixed-voice communications Data center services Cloud-based IT services
- Number of employees: 550 (2014)
- Website: www.kvhasia.com

KVH Co., Ltd., previously known as KVH Telecom, was founded by Fidelity Investments in 1999 as an Asia-Pacific IT/communications service provider. Through its facility-based optical fiber networks, data centers, and cloud services platform, KVH is an information delivery platform providing integrated IT and communication solutions to enterprise businesses. KVH serves media, manufacturing, carrier, and financial services as its key customer segments, and offers all customers bilingual support in Japanese and English.

KVH specializes in operating and developing low-latency networks for the financial services industry, and provides low-latency connectivity to all major Japanese exchanges. KVH's fiber backbone features a flat network hierarchy with few media converters and network devices making it the lowest latency network in metropolitan Japan.

Headquartered in Tokyo, Japan, KVH also has points of presence (PoPs) in Osaka, Hong Kong, Singapore, Chicago, New York, Sydney, Seoul, and Busan, and partner networks in Europe and the Asia Pacific region.

Edward (Ted) Higase was appointed KVH president, chief executive officer and representative director on May 16, 2012.

On November 12, 2014, Colt, a London-based Telecom firm, announced the acquisition of KVH and now KVH is part of Colt Group S.A. With this acquisition, combined KVH and colt (or the Colt Group ) now operates in 28 countries across Europe, Asia and the U.S. with metropolitan area networks in 47 major cities and connections into over 200 cities globally.

== History ==
After being established by Fidelity Investments in April, 1999, KVH began constructing its own low latency, fiber optic networks in Tokyo and Osaka. Following the dot-com crisis of 2000, KVH was one of the few foreign-owned carriers that continued to invest and do business in Japan.

In 2001, KVH introduced the first 2.4 Gbit/s leased line Services to Japan and opened its first data center in Osaka. The following year, KVH opened its second data center in Japan and first in Tokyo, KVH Tokyo Data Center 1 (TDC1). TDC1 was the second largest data center in Tokyo and was accompanied by the launch of KVH's ethernet services, voice TDM services, and co-location and data center operational services within the same year.

Since then, KVH has been expanding its portfolio of services as well as its presence across the Asia-Pacific region. Today, KVH's network extends beyond Japan and connects to Chicago, Singapore, and Hong Kong. In February 2011, KVH opened Tokyo Data Center 2 (TDC2), which is located in Inzai City, Chiba. In 2012, KVH (Singapore) Pte Ltd., KVH Services LLC, KVH Hong Kong Ltd., and KVH Korea Ltd. were established. In March 2013, KVH launched Japan’s first 100G metro Ethernet network service. In April 2013, KVH expanded its business further into Asia Pacific and launched two data centers in Hong Kong and Singapore, KVH Hong Kong Data Center 1 (HKDC1) and KVH Singapore Data Center 1 (SGDC1), and a 10-site cloud platform reaching across Europe and Asia.

On November 12, 2014, Colt, a London-based Telecom firm, announced the acquisition of KVH.

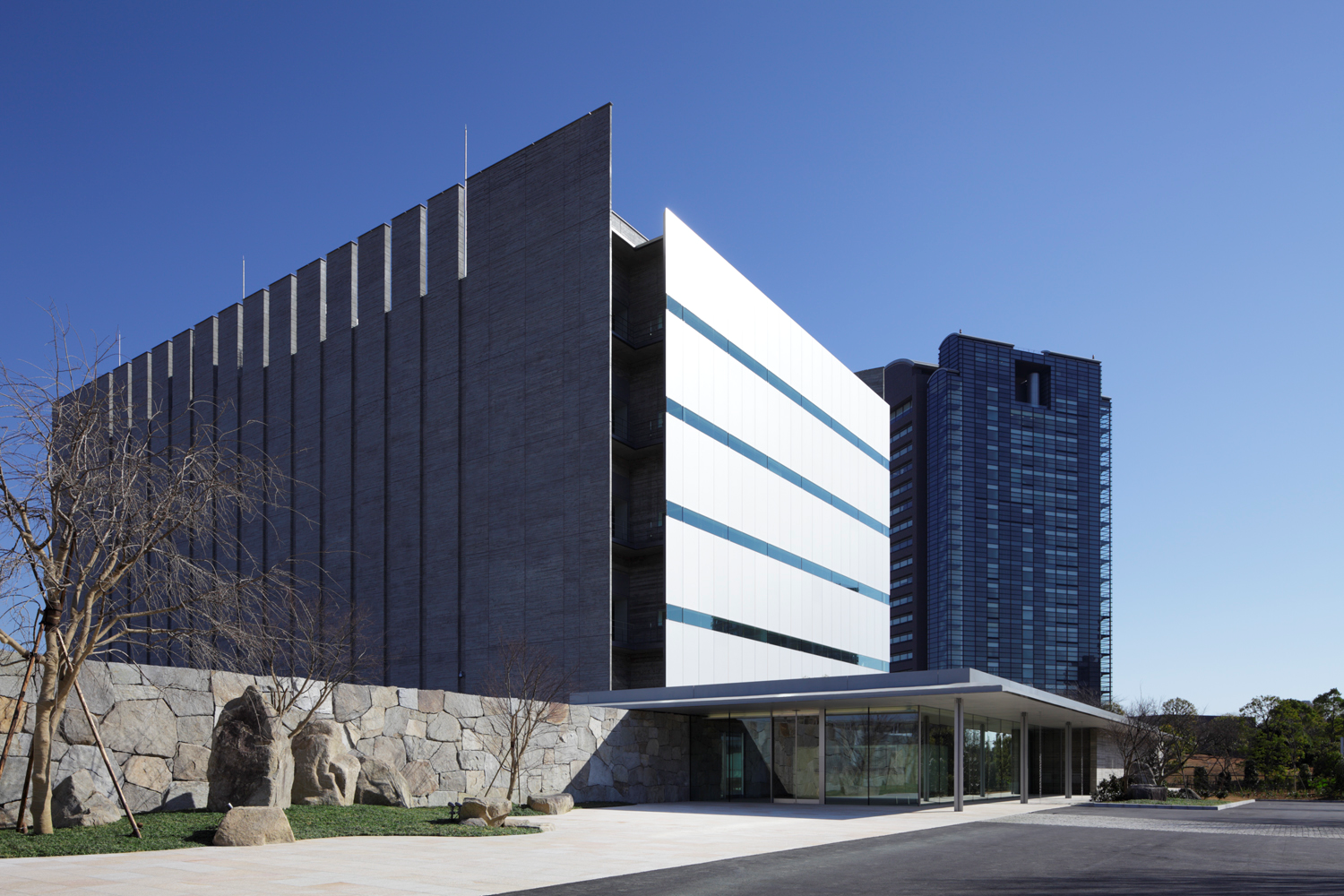
KVH Tokyo Data Center 2

== Products and services ==
- Cloud-based IaaS services
- Managed and co-location services
- Data center real estate services
- Ethernet and IP network services
- Low latency connectivity
- Professional services
- Integrated IT managed services, networking and communication solutions
- Multilingual capabilities
- Voice/VoIP services
