= United Way of Metropolitan Chicago =

US non-profit organization

The United Way of Metropolitan Chicago is a 501(c)(3) non-profit organization and a branch of the United Way. The United Way of Metropolitan Chicago serves the city of Chicago and its surrounding suburbs, allocating funding to other charitable organizations, especially those that provide needed healthcare, education, and income services.

== History ==
=== The Great Depression ===
The United Way of Metropolitan Chicago underwent a variety of name changes and mergers throughout its history. It officially began as an unemployment relief organization. Begun by Chicago business leaders as a means to quell the crippling economic effects of the Great Depression, the as-yet unnamed organization unofficially began in 1930 with a committee of 25 of the city's civic and business leaders. It was in 1932 that the committee was officially recognized as a part of Illinois Governor Louis L. Emerson's Commission on Unemployment and Relief and named the Emergency Welfare Fund.

In 1932 the Welfare Fund changed its focus from unemployment relief to providing funding to other nonprofit agencies through the Community Chest model. (See: Community Chest (organization).) Organizations applied to receive funding from the Welfare Fund, which evolved into a fundraising agency. Some of the Welfare Fund's first applications came from Chicago branches of Catholic Charities USA, the American Red Cross, and The Salvation Army, among others. Also in 1932, the Chicago Urban League became the Welfare Fund's first member organization that primarily served minority communities. The Gads Hill Center was the first charity funded by the Welfare Fund to focus on the needs of the Latino community.

Similar community chests began to emerge in Chicago's suburbs in the 1930s as well.

=== Community Fund ===
In 1933 the Emergency Welfare Fund was renamed the Community Fund of Allied Chicago Charities, only to change again the following year, becoming the Community Fund of Chicago. As the Community Fund, the organization continued to develop its fundraising and allocation systems. During the late 1930s, the Community Fund partnered with the Council of Social Agencies of Chicago, a partnership that would last until 1977. The Council managed volunteers and community referrals, while the Community Fund continued to focus on fundraising and allocations.

In 1937, as unemployment fell, President Franklin D. Roosevelt made federal budget cuts that caused unemployment to rise again, especially in sectors like Chicago's African American community. In that year, the Community Fund became dedicated to funding organizations that attempted to return that community to self-sufficiency.

=== World War II ===
During World War II, national unemployment was greatly alleviated, and the Community Fund accordingly shifted its attention to the war effort, joining with the Community and War Fund between 1943 and 1945 to provide aid to communities affected deeply by the Holocaust and the aftermath of warfare. During the war and the immediate post-war years, the Community Fund's partnership with Chicago's business community, already robust as a result of the Fund's origins in the business community, expanded and strengthened, reinforcing the Fund's influence and resources.

Immediately following the war, Chicago's population boom created new issues that drew the attention of the Community Fund. Rapid growth in the suburbs led to the 1947 creation of the Suburban Community Chest Council, which consolidated disparate community chests in the suburbs. It primarily focused on the needs of the Western suburbs.

=== Fundraising: The Crusade of Mercy ===
The Community Fund's increased interaction with Chicago's business community led to the inception of what is today called the Loaned Executive Program (the Program began as an initiative with several different names). Begun in the mid-1950s, this program nominally borrowed executives, from companies like ComEd, Northern Trust, and LaSalle Bank, to fundraise for the Community Fund. Simultaneously, many large corporations began internal fundraising initiatives. These would encourage employees to sign up for automatic donations; that is, a preset amount of money would be deducted from participant's paychecks and donated to the Community Fund.

These fundraising initiatives were furthered in 1957, when the Community Fund partnered with the Mid-America Chapter of the American Red Cross, forming the Community Fund-Red Cross Joint Appeal. This organization, run by but independent of the Community Fund and the Red Cross, consolidated both organizations' fundraising efforts. In 1959, the organization changed its name to the Crusade of Mercy, and became the Metropolitan Crusade of Mercy in 1964 (it was officially called the Community Fund-Red Cross-Suburban Community Chest Council Crusade of Mercy). Now incorporating suburban Chicago as well as the city proper, the Metropolitan Crusade of Mercy actively campaigned for funds annually, in addition to maintaining Community Chest's corporate employee fundraising program.

In 1980, the Crusade of Mercy merged with the United Way of Metropolitan Chicago (what the Community Fund would become in 1977), becoming the United Way/Crusade of Mercy. This merger brought the Crusade of Mercy's wide-ranging fundraising efforts more fully under the auspices of the United Way. The two United Ways, of Metropolitan Chicago and of Suburban Chicago, were United Way/Crusade of Mercy's two allocating agencies. Also at this time, the Red Cross became a primary grant recipient. Finally, in 1995, United Way/Crusade of Mercy was merged into the United Way of Metropolitan Chicago. It continued to service suburban Chicago as well as the city.

=== The 1970s: Restructuring ===
In 1963, America's national Community Chest system consolidated and became the United Way of America. The Community Fund, because it was a community chest organization, became an affiliate of the new United Way in that year. By 1975, the Community Fund of Chicago was the largest entity in the national United Way system. The Suburban Community Chest Council was likewise now associated with the United Way, and it became the United Way of Suburban Chicago in 1976.

The Council of Social Agencies of Chicago, with which the Community Fund had partnered in the 1940s, had become the Welfare Council of Metropolitan Chicago by 1951, and by 1973 was known as the Council for Community Services of Metropolitan Chicago. By this time, the Council for Community Services performed a function very similar to that of the Community Fund; it was a fundraising entity that allocated funds to other non-profits. On July 1, 1977, the Community Fund and the Council for Community Services combined to form United Way of Metropolitan Chicago. This act consolidated allocation efforts and allowed the new United Way to focus more attention on planning, research, public policy issues, and community referral services. The United Way of Metropolitan Chicago received the bulk of its funds from the Metropolitan Crusade of Mercy, and in addition to maintaining its allocation process, it now also ran two additional programs: the Voluntary Action Center and the Community Referral Service.

After the 1977 merger, the United Way began to work with Comprehensive Community Services, Inc., an independent agency entirely funded by the United Way. Comprehensive Community Services in turn funded agencies, both several also funded by United Way directly, and others not affiliated with United Way. Begun in 1972, Comprehensive Community Services had a special focus on governmental relations, and dealt frequently with the Illinois Department of Children and Family Services (DCFS). Comprehensive Community Services' primary service focus was children; they developed an initiative to assist adolescents, called the Joint Service Program for Adolescents, that helped placement and group home non-profits in their dealings with DCFS. Comprehensive Community Services also participated in GAP, an initiative that aimed to raise awareness about and resources allocated for teen pregnancy.

=== The 1980s and 1990s ===
In 1982, the United Way of Metropolitan Chicago underwent yet another name change, becoming simply the United Way of Chicago. In 1983, concurrent with the election of Mayor Harold Washington and renewed fears of unemployment, the United Way of Chicago launched its Special Grants and Incentives Program (also called Priority Grants or Venture Grants). This program allowed United Way to allocate additional funds to severely underserved communities. This initiative required United Way to measure economic need, something that sparked a debate regarding the nature and efficacy of deeming a community especially economically underserved. The debate holds that, in essence, determining need requires more than simply evaluating economic factors, and that to privilege one community is to deny another.

Throughout the 1980s and 1990s, the United Way continued to expand its focus on minority groups. In 1994, about 90 percent of the organization's fund recipients were organizations that served minorities. In the mid-1990s, United Way created Outreach Committees to focus on and directly reach out to Chicago's minority communities.

=== Consolidation ===
The early 2000s were a time of great change and consolidation within the United Way. In 2000 the organization changed its name to the United Way in Chicago. In 2003, under President and CEO Janet Froetscher, the United Way in Chicago and the by now overwhelmingly numerous suburban United Ways consolidated into one organization, the United Way of Metropolitan Chicago. This was the largest non-profit merger in history.

The newly consolidated United Way continued focusing on minority communities, launching the African American Initiative in 2005 and the Latin American Initiative in 2007.

== Live United 2020 ==
In 2013, United Way of Metropolitan Chicago's primary initiative, Live United 2020, focuses on providing quality healthcare, financial stability and a good education to underserved communities to aid particularly poverty-stricken communities to battle Chicago's infamous iniquities, especially in the wake of Mayor Rahm Emanuel and the city's decision to close 40 Chicago Public Schools primarily in the economically stricken areas of the West and South sides.

== Administration ==
The United Way of Metropolitan Chicago consists of an Executive Board and a Board of Directors, and remains intimately tied to Chicago's corporate community through corporate fundraising efforts and the Loaned Executive Program.

In 2013, the Chair of the Board of Directors is Ellen Costello, CEO and US Country Head of BMO Financial Group. The Vice-Chairs are Deborah L. DeHaas (CIO, Deloitte), Jay L. Henderson (Vice Chairman, Client Service, PricewaterhouseCoopers), and Frederick H. Waddell (Chairman and CEO, Northern Trust). The President and CEO is Wendy DuBoe.

=== Corporate Partnerships ===
True to its origins, United Way maintains its close corporate partnerships. In 2012, the highest corporate contributor to the United Way was Northern Trust. United Way of Metropolitan Chicago's top contributors in 2012 were:

- Northern Trust
- BMO Financial Group
- Illinois Tool Works
- UPS
- AT&T
- Deloitte
- Exelon
- Bank of America
- PricewaterhouseCoopers
- Ernst & Young
- KPMG
- Blue Cross Blue Shield of Illinois
- Wells Fargo
- William Blair & Company
- General Electric
- Sargent & Lundy
- Allstate
- Nicor
- Kellogg's
- HSBC
- Chase
- USBank

=== Loaned Executive Program ===
The following companies are currently (2013) active in United Way of Metropolitan Chicago's Loaned Executive Program. They contribute to the United Way by "lending" executives to aid United Way during their fundraising campaigns, a program that dates to the mid-1950s.

- Blue Cross Blue Shield of Illinois
- BMO Financial Group
- FedEx
- Illinois Tool Works
- Nicor
- Northern Trust
