= Colt Technology Services =

Multinational telecommunications and data centre services company

Colt Technology Services Group Limited
- Industry: Telecoms, Managed services
- Founded: 1992 in London
- Founder: James Hynes
- Headquarters: London, England, UK
- Area served: Europe; United States; Asia
- Key people: Michael Wilens (Chairman); Keri Gilder (CEO)
- Parent: Fidelity Investments
- ASN: 8220
- Website: colt.net

Colt Technology Services Group Limited (formerly COLT Telecom Group S.A.) is a multinational telecommunications company headquartered in London, United Kingdom. It was listed on the London Stock Exchange and was a constituent of the FTSE 250 Index until it was acquired by Fidelity Investments in August 2015. Colt was originally an acronym for City Of London Telecommunications.

== History ==
Colt was founded as City Of London Telecommunications in 1992 by James Hynes, with funds provided by Fidelity Investments. The company began to construct a telecoms network in London. In 1993 it was awarded a licence to compete with British Telecom and Cable and Wireless in voice and data transmission. It was first listed on the London Stock Exchange in 1996. The group later expanded into Europe, building networks in major European cities over the next 10 years.

In 2001, Fidelity helped the company raise a further £400m in financing, and acquired a majority share in it as part of a bailout agreement. In April 2009, Colt completed an open offer, raising €199.1m before expenses.

In May 2011 the company acquired a majority share in MarketPrizm, a provider of low-latency market data and trading infrastructure services. In August 2012 Colt acquired a majority share in ThinkGrid, a cloud platform for delivery of hosted services. On 12 November 2014, Colt acquired KVH, a Japanese telecoms company, helping Colt expand in the growing Asian market. In August 2015 the company was fully acquired by Fidelity. On 2 November 2022, Colt agreed to acquire Lumen Technologies' Europe, Middle East and Africa (EMEA) business for $1.8 billion.

In August 2025, the company suffered a cyber attack in which the attacker was able to access customer data.
