= BMO Bank =

US bank

BMO Bank, N.A.

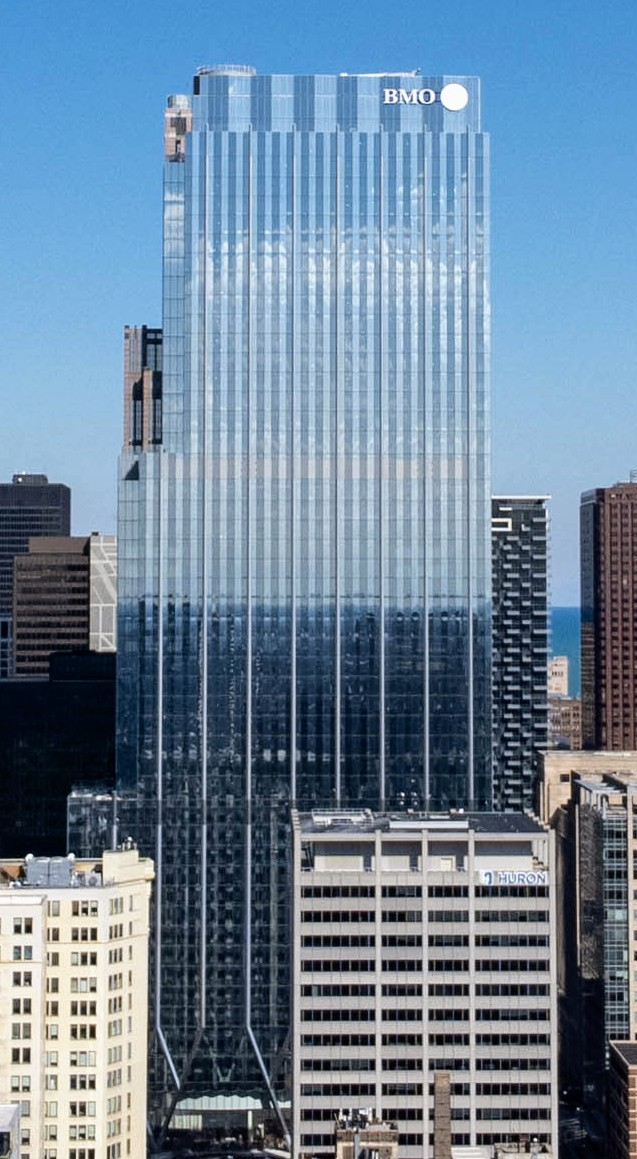
- BMO Tower, Chicago
- Trade name: BMO
- Formerly: N.W. Harris & Co. (1882–1907); M&I Marshall & Ilsley Bank (1847–2012); Harris Trust and Savings Bank (1907–1972); Harris Bank, N.A. (1972–2005; Harris Bank name then retired in 2005); BMO Harris Bank, N.A. (2011–2023)
- Type: Subsidiary
- Industry: Banking; Investment banking; Financial services
- Predecessors: Suburban Bancorp; Marshall & Ilsley; Bank of the West
- Founded: 1882; 144 years ago
- Founder: Norman Wait Harris
- Headquarters: Chicago, Illinois, U.S.
- Key people: Darryl White (CEO—BMO Financial Group); Darrel Hackett (US CEO)
- Products: Consumer banking, corporate banking, private banking, financial analysis, insurance, investment banking, mortgage loans, private equity, wealth management, credit cards
- Owner: Harris Bankcorp, Inc. (1972–1984); Bank of Montreal (through BMO Financial Group; 1984–present)
- Number of employees: 55,767 (FTE, 2023)
- Parent: Bankmont Financial Corporation (1984–2004); Harris Financial Corporation (2004–2011); BMO Financial Corporation (2011–present)
- Website: www.bmo.com

BMO Bank, N.A. (colloquially BMO; US: /biːmoʊ/ BEE-moh) is a U.S. national bank headquartered in Chicago, Illinois. It is a subsidiary of the Canadian multinational investment bank and financial services company Bank of Montreal, which owns it through the holding company BMO Financial Corporation (formerly Bankmont Financial Corporation, then Harris Financial Corporation). As of March 2024, it was the 15th largest bank in the United States by total assets.

The bank was founded in Chicago in 1882 as N.W. Harris & Co. by Norman Wait Harris before changing its name to Harris Trust and Savings Bank in 1907 and then Harris Bank in 1972. After the Bank of Montreal acquired the company in 1984, it became branded as BMO Harris Bank by 2011. Under the Bank of Montreal's ownership, the company increased its presence in the U.S. through a series of acquisitions of other banks, such as Suburban Bancorp in 1994, Marshall & Ilsley in 2011, and Bank of the West in 2023. Coinciding with the Bank of the West merger, the U.S. bank announced that it would retire the "BMO Harris Bank" brand in favor of the global "BMO" brand of its Bank of Montreal's parent financial services corporation.

== History ==
In 1882, Norman Wait Harris established N.W. Harris & Co., a Chicago-based municipal bond broker and the forerunner of Harris Bank. Harris Trust and Savings Bank was established in 1907. It merged with Chicago National Bank in 1960 and was restructured as Harris Bank, N.A. in 1972. Bank of Montreal (later known as BMO Financial Group) acquired control of Harris in 1984.

The bank grew rapidly through a series of acquisitions, beginning with the First National Bank of Barrington in 1985, State Bank of St. Charles and First National Bank of Batavia in 1988, and Libertyville Federal Savings Bank and Loan and Frankfort Bancshares in 1990. Harris Bankcorp and Suburban Bancorp combined under the Harris name in 1994 and the company acquired 54 Chicago area branches from Household Bank in 1996. In 1999, the direct brokerage firm Burke, Christensen & Lewis merged with Harris Investors Direct to form Harris InvestorLine. The company's further acquisitions include Freeman Welwood in 2000; Village Bank of Naples and Century Bank (Arizona) and First National Bank of Joliet in 2001; and Northwestern Trust and Investors Advisory Company (Seattle) in 2002. Also in 2002, InvestorLine combined with CSFBdirect to form Harrisdirect and Harris acquired online client accounts of Morgan Stanley Individual Investor Group and myCFO. In 2003, it purchased Sullivan, Bruyette Speros & Blayney Incorporated, followed by Lakeland Community Bank in Round Lake and Villa Park Trust and Savings Bank in 2005.

BMO continued its acquisitions in 2007 with First National Bank & Trust (Kokomo, Indiana), followed by Ozaukee Bank (Cedarburg, Wisconsin) and Merchant and Manufacturers Bankcorp Inc. (New Berlin, Wisconsin) in 2008 and Amcore Bank N.A. (Rockford, Illinois) in 2010.

On December 17, 2010, Bank of Montreal agreed to purchase Milwaukee-based Marshall & Ilsley Corporation in an all-stock transaction valued at about $4.1 billion. Marshall & Ilsley and Harris Bankcorp were both rebranded as BMO Harris. The company restructured as BMO Bankcorp in 2011.

In 2015, the company completed its acquisition of General Electric Capital Corp.'s transportation finance business.

BMO was the bank with the second-most deposits in Chicago by June 2018, with 11.5% market share. Also that month, its BMO Harris division was operating in eight US states.

In 2021, Bank of Montreal agreed to purchase Bank of the West with the intent to merge it with BMO Harris Bank, which would at least double its U.S. presence. The acquisition of Bank of the West was completed in February 2023, and the Bank of the West brand was absorbed into the global BMO brand later that year. Coinciding with this merger, BMO Harris Bank announced that it would retire the combined "BMO Harris" brand and start to use the global BMO brand of its Canadian parent company. The company now primarily does business as "BMO Bank N.A.".

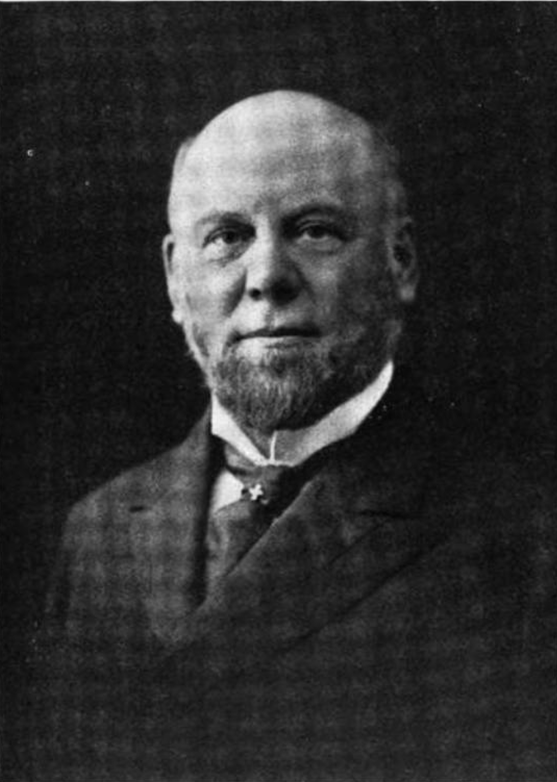
Norman Wait Harris (c. 1911), founder of N.W. Harris & Co., later Harris Trust & Savings Bank

== Operations ==
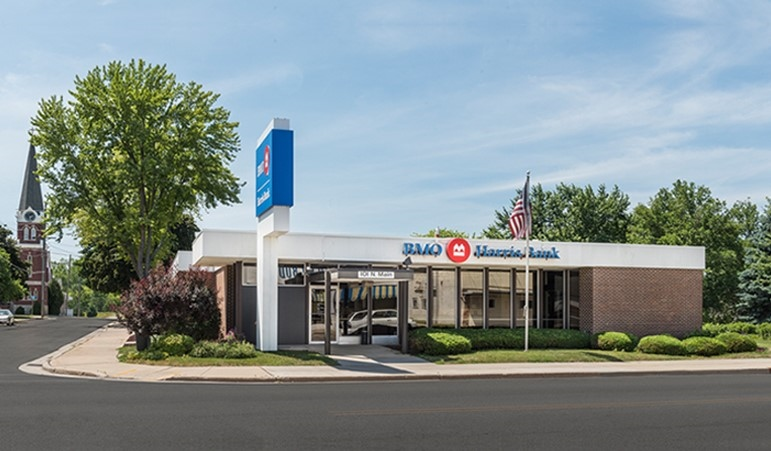
A BMO branch in Black Creek, Wisconsin

BMO is one of the largest banks in the Midwest, with over 600 branches and approximately 1,300 ATMs in Illinois, Iowa, Wisconsin, Indiana, Kansas, Missouri, Minnesota, Arizona, Florida and California. It is the second-largest Chicago-area bank based on market share, behind JPMorgan Chase, and the second largest US subsidiary of a Canadian bank after TD Bank, N.A. (owned by the Toronto-Dominion Bank). BMO is the issuer of the Diners Club cards in the United States.

== Headquarters ==
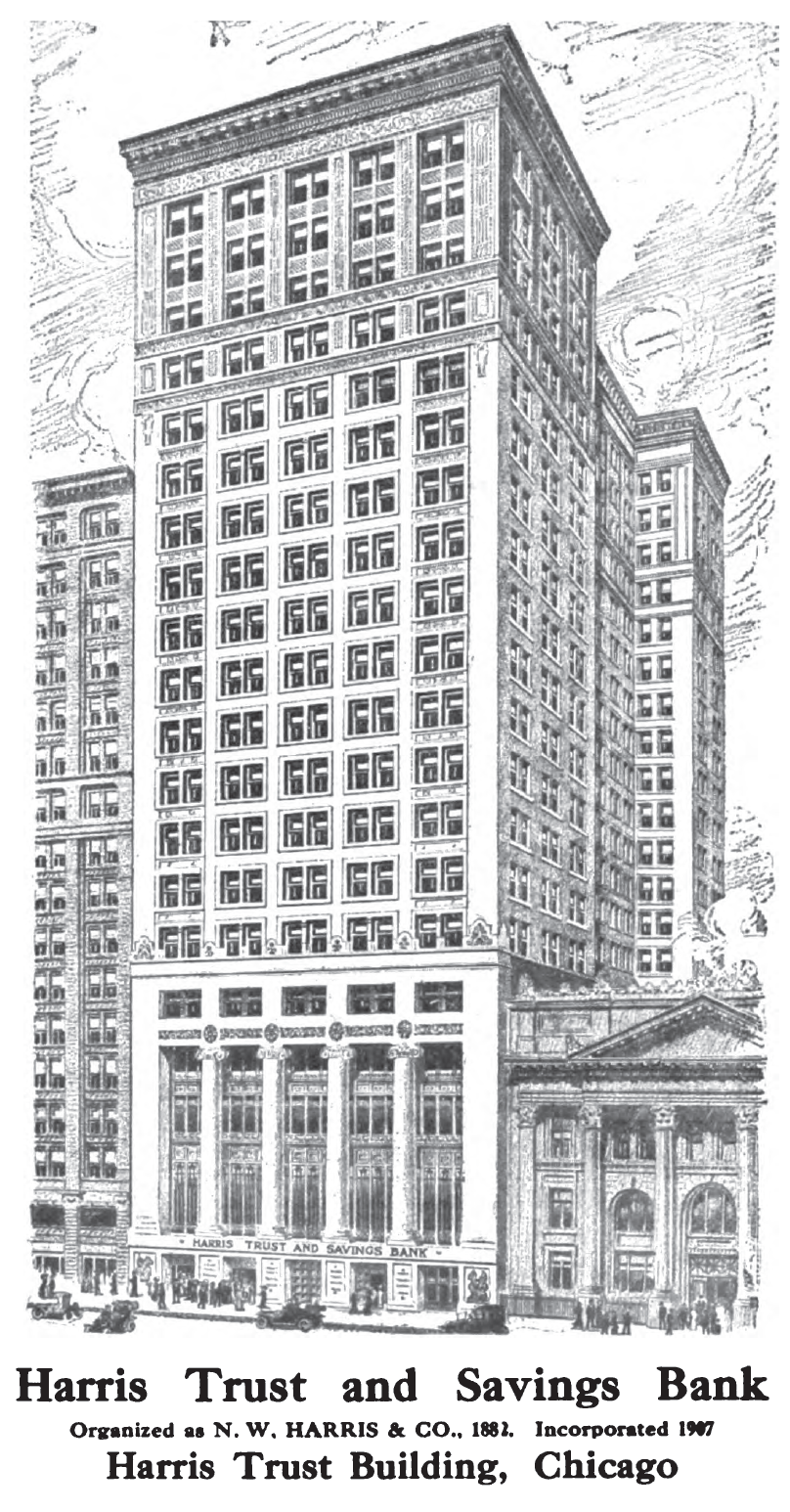
Harris Trust Building in Chicago (c. 1911)

BMO was headquartered in a complex of three buildings in Chicago's Loop neighborhood. The original 21-story building was constructed in 1910 at 119 West Monroe Street. The entrance to the building is flanked by two bas-relief sculptures of lions, which inspired various iterations of the bank's logo until 2011, along with the bank's mascot character, Hubert the Lion. In 1960, a 23-story structure was added to the east with the address of 111 West Monroe. In 1974, a second 38-story tower was added to the west, with the address of 115 South LaSalle Street. Both additions were designed by the firm of Skidmore, Owings and Merrill and are in the modern style. The bank uses the address of the 1960 building.

In December 2018, the bank announced it would move its headquarters to 14 floors of a 50-story office tower adjacent to Chicago Union Station. The new BMO Tower opened in 2022.

Additionally, notable BMO buildings are located in Milwaukee (BMO Harris Financial Center), at 770 North Water Street, and Indianapolis (BMO Plaza). In 2017, the bank began construction of a 25-story BMO Tower at North Water and East Wells, adjacent to its current Milwaukee headquarters. The bank expects to occupy 123,000 square feet (11,400 m^{2}) of the building beginning in December 2019. In August 2017, BMO sold the 20-story structure it currently occupies to real estate firm Irgens, which plans to remodel and lease it.

== Naming rights and sponsorships ==
BMO owns corporate naming rights to the following:

- BMO Stadium in Los Angeles, California
- BMO Center in Rockford, Illinois
- BMO Pavilion at Summerfest in Milwaukee – Official Sponsor of Summerfest.

BMO Bank is a sponsor of:

- Chicago Blackhawks – Official bank of the Chicago Blackhawks.
- Chicago Bulls – Official bank of the Chicago Bulls.
- Chicago White Sox – Official partner of the Chicago White Sox.
- Los Angeles FC – Official bank and shirt sponsor of Los Angeles FC.
- Milwaukee Bucks – Official bank of the Milwaukee Bucks.
- Minnesota Wild – Official partner of the Minnesota Wild.
- Rockford IceHogs of the AHL, the Chicago Blackhawks affiliate – Official bank of the Rockford IceHogs.
- Wisconsin Badgers Athletics – Official partner of the UW-Madison Badgers.

== See also ==
- Harris, Hall & Co., securities affiliate established in 1934, following passage of the Glass–Steagall Act and acquired by Dean Witter & Co. in 1953
- Harris, Forbes & Co., securities affiliate established in 1911 and acquired by Chase Manhattan Bank in 1930
