= DuPont Walston =

Former U.S. brokerage and investment banking firm

DuPont Walston, Inc. was a former U.S. brokerage and investment banking firm. At its peak in the early 1970s, DuPont Walston was the second largest brokerage firm in the U.S. However, the firm collapsed following a series of mergers and closed in 1974.

DuPont Walston was formed from the 1973 merger of F. I. DuPont, Glore Forgan & Co. and Walston & Co. The latter, Wall Street's third largest brokerage house, was acquired by Ross Perot following pension account fraud, who then merged it with Dupont, which had found itself in financial difficulties.

Just a few years earlier, F.I. Dupont had been created through the 1970 combination of Francis I. duPont Co. and Glore Forgan Staats, Inc., which itself was formed through the combination of Glore, Forgan Co. and Wm. R. Staats Co. in 1964.
