= Harold L. Stuart =

American financier

- Born: 1881; Providence, Rhode Island, United States
- Died: 1966 (aged 84–85)
- Occupation: Financier
- Known for: Founder of Halsey, Stuart & Co.

Harold L. Stuart was a prominent American financier of the early 20th century, and founder of the investment firm Halsey, Stuart & Co.

== Early life ==
Stuart was born in Providence, Rhode Island in 1881, and moved to Chicago as a boy. He began working in Chicago at just 12 years old as a messenger boy for a printing firm. Some of his other early jobs included being a stock boy at Marshall Field & Company.

== Career ==
As a teenager, he became a bond salesman for the predecessor company to the Harris Trust Bank.

In 1903, he opened a Chicago branch office for the recently founded New York investment firm, N. W. Halsey Company. Stuart competed with New York bankers when he started handling small bond offerings for the utility magnate Samuel Insull in 1907.

When N. W. Halsey died around the year 1911, Stuart bought the Chicago office of that organization and established Halsey, Stuart & Co. In 1922, due to his growing trust in Stuart, Insull entrusted Stuart with a $27 million bond offering at a time when the bond market did not look promising. Stuart was able to move the issue at an extremely low interest rate and as a result, Stuart become one of Insull's chief financial officers.

Later in his life, Stuart recalled that he and Insull did about $2.3 billion worth of business.

== Death ==
In 1953, Federal Judge Harold R. Medina wrote that Stuart “probably knew more about the investment banking business than any other living person” after Stuart appeared as a government expert witness in an anti-trust suit brought against 17 leading investment houses. At the time of Stuart's death in 1966, the New York Times called Halsey, Stuart “one of the largest investment banking firms.”

== Legacy ==
His decision to move the firm's headquarters to Chicago played an important role in establishing the city as a leading financial center. In 1969, his bequest to Illinois Institute of Technology (IIT) established the Harold Leonard Stuart School of Management and Finance, now the IIT Stuart School of Business.

In 1969, IIT received a $5 million bequest from the Stuart estate which enabled the university to begin construction on the Stuart School of Business. The Stuart family has been key to the growth and progress of both the educational and research programs at IIT Stuart School of Business. It became the only business school in Chicago with a marketing analytics program that emphasizes data-driven methodologies and that provided a part-time Ph.D. program.
