= Halsey, Stuart & Co. =

Defunct investment bank

- Company type: Acquired
- Industry: Financial services
- Founded: 1911
- Defunct: 1974
- Fate: Acquired in 1974 by Bache & Co.
- Successor: Bache Halsey Stuart Shields; Prudential-Bache Securities
- Headquarters: Chicago, Illinois, United States
- Key people: Harold L. Stuart
- Products: Investment banking

Halsey, Stuart (later Bache Halsey Stuart Shields) was a Chicago-based investment bank founded in 1911.

In 1952, the firm made headlines when its managing partner, Harold L. Stuart, testified before the U.S. Supreme Court for the government's antitrust case against Morgan Stanley and 16 other major investment banks. The fact that Halsey, Stuart was a significant Wall Street player (responsible for the most IPOs in 1951) led some observers to suspect that they had provoked the government's antitrust suit. This claim that Halsey was a major IPO player is factually incorrect, Halsey, Stuart was not involved in significant equity trades or IPOs. It may have owned a seat on a regional stock exchange, as a matter of prestige, but was not a member of the NYSE and had no equity trading operations. This firm was a fixed income underwriter and trader, municipal bonds, railroad equipment trusts certificates and utility bonds. The hearings in question came about because Halsey was excluded from industrial bond underwriting by the 16 noted above in retaliation for the firm's helping to foster legislation causing public utilities to sell their bond offering at public auction - industrial underwriting were negotiated sales involving the big 16 but not Halsey. There is a book by Forrest McDonald - The Phaeton Ride: The Crisis of American Success , published in 1974, which speaks to the connections among the Insull affair, Halsey, Stuart and these hearings.

The firm was purchased by Bache & Co. in 1974, from Chicago Title and Trust Inc., to form Bache Halsey Stuart Shields & Co. The combined firm was acquired by Prudential Insurance in 1981, leading to the creation of Prudential-Bache Securities.
