= Nature of Man Series =

- African Genesis, The Territorial Imperative, The Social Contract, The Hunting Hypothesis
- Author: Robert Ardrey
- Illustrator: Berdine Ardrey (née Grunewald)
- Country: United States
- Language: English
- Discipline: paleoanthropology, ethology, evolutionary biology
- Media type: Print
- No. of books: Four

The Nature of Man Series is a four-volume series of works in paleoanthropology by the prolific playwright, screenwriter, and science writer Robert Ardrey. The books in the series were published between 1961 and 1976.

The series majorly undermined standing assumptions in social sciences, leading to an abandonment of the "blank slate" hypothesis; incited a renaissance in the science of ethology; and led to widespread popular interest in human evolution and human origins.

The first work, African Genesis (1961), particularly helped revive interest in ethology, and was a direct precursor to the Konrad Lorenz's On Aggression (1966), Desmond Morris's The Naked Ape (1967), Lionel Tiger's Men in Groups (1969), and Tiger and Robin Fox's The Imperial Animal (1971). The director of the Smithsonian Institution's Human Origins Program Rick Potts, cited Ardrey's work as inspiring him to go anthropology.

The works were wildly popular and influenced the public imagination. Stanley Kubrick cited them as major influences in developing his films 2001: A Space Odyssey (1968) and A Clockwork Orange (1971).

== Robert Ardrey ==
Robert Ardrey was a playwright, screenwriter, and science writer. By the time he returned to the science in the 1950s, he already had a decorated Hollywood and Broadway career, including the award of a Guggenheim Fellowship and an Academy Award nomination for best screenplay.

In 1955 Ardrey travelled to Africa, where he wrote a series of articles for The Reporter. At the same time he renewed an acquaintance with prominent geologist Richard Foster Flint and investigated claims made by Raymond Dart about a specimen of Australopithecus africanus. This trip would initiate the decades of work Ardrey completed in the field of human evolution.

== African Genesis (1961) ==
The central thesis of African Genesis: A Personal Investigation into the Animal Origins and Nature of Man was that early man evolved from carnivorous African predecessors, and not, as was then the scientific consensus, from Asian herbivores. It drew particularly on the scientific work of Raymond Dart and Konrad Lorenz. This thesis has been proven and is now scientific doctrine.

African Genesis also challenged a key methodological assumption of the social sciences, namely that human behavior was distinct from animal behavior. Ardrey instead asserted that evolutionarily inherited traits were a major factor in determining human behavior. This was a hugely controversial hypothesis, though it has gained widespread acceptance today. It was a major theme that would extend throughout the Nature of Man books and continue to surround them with controversy.

African Genesis was a major popular success. It was an international bestseller translated into dozens of languages. In 1962 it was a finalist for the National Book Award in nonfiction. In 1969 Time magazine named African Genesis the most notable nonfiction book of the 1960s.

== The Territorial Imperative (1966) ==
The Territorial Imperative: A Personal Inquiry Into the Animal Origins of Property and Nations extends Ardrey's work in examining the effects of inherited evolutionary traits on human social behavior with an emphasis on the hold that territory has on man. In particular it demonstrates the influence of the drive to possess territory on such phenomena as property ownership and nation-building.

The Territorial Imperative further developed the nascent science of ethology and increased public interest in human origins.

Like African Genesis it was also an international bestseller and saw translation into dozens of languages. It influenced several notable figures. Stanley Kubrick cited Ardrey as an inspiration for his films 2001: A Space Odyssey and A Clockwork Orange. The strategic analyst Andrew Marshall and U.S. Secretary of Defense James Schlesinger are known to have discussed The Territorial Imperative in connection to military-strategic thinking.

== The Social Contract (1970) ==
The Social Contract: A Personal Inquiry into the Evolutionary Sources of Order and Disorder is the most controversial book of the Nature of Man series. It sought to apply evolutionary thinking to the creation of social order. In particular it examined inherited characteristics' effects in determining hierarchy and inequality. Ardrey argued that, while inequality was not necessarily a social evil, it could only be justly expressed under conditions of absolute equality of opportunity. He also argued that the presence of inequality does not justify the domination of the weak by the strong. "Ardrey showed that in all societies at any level of the animal world, structures exist to protect the vulnerable, and that this is an evolutionary advantage as it protects diversity, diversity being essential for creativity."

The Social Contract continued Ardrey's refutation of cultural determinists through interwoven analyses of animal and human behavior. It also emphasized the importance of a reasoned respect for nature, foreshadowing the environmental concerns of The Hunting Hypothesis.

== The Hunting Hypothesis (1976) ==
The Hunting Hypothesis: A Personal Conclusion Concerning the Evolutionary Nature of Man continued Ardrey's examination of the importance of inherited evolutionary traits. In particular it demonstrated the determinant force of traits that co-evolved in early man with hunting behavior.

At the time of publication, it was not even commonly accepted that early man were hunters, much less that hunting behavior influenced their evolution. Following publication of Ardrey's work this thesis gained support and eventually widespread acceptance."For decades researchers have been locked in debate over how and when hunting began and how big a role it played in human evolution. Recent analyses of human anatomy, stone tools and animal bones are helping to fill in the details of this game-changing shift in subsistence strategy. This evidence indicates that hunting evolved far earlier than some scholars had envisioned – and profoundly impacted subsequent human evolution."

The Hunting Hypothesis was also one of the first books to warn about climate change as a possible existential threat to mankind.

The Hunting Hypothesis, with some exceptions, was remarkably well reviewed. The famed biologist and naturalist E. O. Wilson, the noted anthropologist Colin Turnbull, the acclaimed journalist Max Lerner, and the noteworthy social scientist Roger Masters, among others, all wrote effusive reviews. Antony Jay wrote that "Robert Ardrey's books are the most important to be written since the war and arguable in the 20th century."
