= Political and religious beliefs of Stanley Kubrick =

The political and religious views of filmmaker Stanley Kubrick (1928–1999) have been subjects of speculation during his lifetime and after his death. It is generally agreed that Kubrick was fascinated by the possibilities of a supernatural reality, as reflected in 2001: A Space Odyssey (1968) and The Shining (1980).

== Politics ==
In his memoir of Kubrick, Michael Herr, his friend and co-writer of the screenplay for Full Metal Jacket (1987), wrote:

Stanley had views on everything, but I would not exactly call them political... His views on democracy were those of most people I know, neither left nor right, not exactly brimming with belief, a noble failed experiment along our evolutionary way, brought low by base instincts, money and self-interest and stupidity... He thought the best system might be under a benign despot, though he had little belief that such a man could be found. He wasn't a cynic, but he could have easily passed for one. He was certainly a capitalist. He believed himself to be a realist.

Herr recalls that Kubrick was sometimes akin to a 19th-century liberal-humanist, that he distrusted almost all authority, that he once alluded to Irving Kristol's definition of a neoconservative ("a liberal who has been mugged by reality") in a favourable way.

Herr further wrote that Kubrick owned guns and did not think that war was an entirely bad thing. In the documentary Stanley Kubrick: A Life in Pictures, Herr says "…he also accepted that it was perfectly okay to acknowledge that, of all the things war is, it's also very beautiful." The writer said of initial reactions to Full Metal Jacket that "The political left will call Kubrick a fascist." In a 1987 interview with Gene Siskel, called Candidly Kubrick, Kubrick said, "Full Metal Jacket suggests there is more to say about war than it is just bad." He added that everything serious the drill instructor says, such as "A rifle is only a tool, it is a hard heart that kills", is completely true.

Frederic Raphael, who co-wrote the Eyes Wide Shut screenplay with Kubrick, claimed that the filmmaker once allegedly remarked that A.H. [Adolf Hitler] had been "right about almost everything". Raphael, initially unsure how to respond, ultimately decided it was "an unassuming jest". Kubrick's relationship to his own ethnicity allegedly deeply troubled Raphael, a fellow Jew. Raphael was equally puzzled by Kubrick's critique of Schindler's List. After Raphael mentioned Schindler’s List during a discussion about films about the Holocaust, Kubrick apparently replied: “Think that was about the Holocaust? That was about success, wasn't it? The Holocaust is about six million people who get killed. 'Schindler's List’ was about six hundred people who don't." Kubrick's friend Steven Spielberg, the director of the film, disbelievingly responded that he "didn't recognize the voice of Stanley" in Raphael's interviews. Christiane Kubrick, Kubrick's wife of more than four decades, has also stated that Frederic Raphael's memoir Eyes Wide Open, where these allegations were made, is an unreliable biography of Kubrick.

Though some have said Kubrick disliked America, Michael Herr says that America was all he talked about and that he often thought of moving back. Herr wrote that Kubrick was sent VHS tapes from American friends of NFL Football, Seinfeld, The Simpsons, and other television shows that he could not get in the United Kingdom. Kubrick told Siskel that he was not anti-American and thought that America was a good country, though he did not think that Ronald Reagan was a good president. In the interview, he also predicted an economic meltdown worldwide by pointing out to Siskel that most of the major banks in the United States held dubious foreign bonds as collateral and huge third world loans treated as assets. Kubrick likened this to the Hans Christian Andersen fairy tale about the "Emperor's New Clothes", and felt even during the Cold War, an economic collapse was more worrisome and imminent than nuclear annihilation was. As far as Kubrick's views on welfare and taxation, according to Ian Watson, Kubrick said of the pre-1997 Labour Party that "If the Labourites ever get in, I’ll leave the country." Watson claims that Kubrick feared being ruined by tax-the-rich policies and was opposed to welfare in general.

Kubrick's earlier work is seen by Pauline Kael as more socially liberal than his later work. (She also viewed his early work much more favorably.) The early films embody liberal ideals, and the satire of government and military in Dr. Strangelove seems to point to a liberal political perspective. Similarly, film analyst Glenn Perusek thinks Kubrick's earlier Paths of Glory reflects a Rousseauist vision of man with natural human sympathy crushed by the artifice of society; later Kubrick films abandon that perspective. While Kael viewed Dr. Strangelove as a liberal film, Kagan disagrees, holding the film to be written from the point of view of a detached realist, lacking the overt liberalism of similar anti-war films of the era such as On the Beach or Fail-Safe.

Kubrick's more mature works are more pessimistic and suspicious of the so-called innate goodness of mankind, and are critical of stances based on that positive assessment. For example, in A Clockwork Orange, the police are as violent and vulgar as the droogs, and Kubrick depicts both the subversive liberal writer Mr. Alexander and the authoritarian status quo Minister of the Interior as manipulative and sinister, saying:

The Minister, played by Anthony Sharp, is clearly a figure of the Right. The writer, Patrick Magee, is a lunatic of the Left... They differ only in their dogma. Their means and ends are hardly distinguishable.

Regarding A Clockwork Orange, Kubrick also shared his views on the nature of man:

Man isn't a noble savage, he's an ignoble savage. He is irrational, brutal, weak, silly, unable to be objective about anything where his own interests are involved—that about sums it up. I'm interested in the brutal and violent nature of man because it's a true picture of him. And any attempt to create social institutions on a false view of the nature of man is probably doomed to failure.

He went on to say:

The idea that social restraints are all bad is based on a utopian and unrealistic vision of man. But in this movie, you have an example of social institutions gone a bit berserk. Obviously, social institutions faced with the law-and-order problem might choose to become grotesquely oppressive. The movie poses two extremes: it shows Alex in his precivilized state, and society committing a worse evil in attempting to cure him."

When New York Times writer Fred M. Hechinger wrote a piece that declared A Clockwork Orange "fascist", Kubrick responded:

It is quite true that my film's view of man is less flattering than the one Rousseau entertained in a similarly allegorical narrative—but, in order to avoid fascism, does one have to view man as a noble savage rather than an ignoble one? Being a pessimist is not yet enough to qualify one to be regarded as a tyrant (I hope)... The age of the alibi, in which we find ourselves, began with the opening sentence of Rousseau's Emile: 'Nature made me happy and good, and if I am otherwise, it is society's fault.' It is based on two misconceptions: that man in his natural state was happy and good, and that primal man had no society... Rousseau's romantic fallacy that it is society which corrupts man, not man who corrupts society, places a flattering gauze between ourselves and reality. This view, to use Mr. Hechinger's frame of reference, is solid box office but, in the end, such a self-inflating illusion leads to despair.

Kubrick quoted extensively from Robert Ardrey, author of African Genesis and The Social Contract—not to be confused with Rousseau's—and author Arthur Koestler from his book The Ghost in the Machine. Both authors (Koestler through psychology and Ardrey through anthropology and evolutionary theory) searched for the cause of humanity's capacity for death and destruction, and both, like Kubrick, were suspicious of the liberal belief in the innate goodness of mankind. Ardrey and Kubrick both attribute this belief to Rousseau, who, in Ardrey's words, "Fathered the romantic fallacy".

When asked by Michel Ciment in an interview if he was an anarchist, Kubrick replied: "I am certainly not an anarchist, and I don't think of myself as a pessimist. I believe very strongly in parliamentary democracy, and I am of the opinion that the power and authority of the State should be optimized and exercised only to the extent that is required to keep things civilized."

In his interview with The New York Times, Kubrick stated that his view of mankind's innate capacity for violence and terror was closer to those of Christianity than to humanism or Jewish theology, saying, "I mean, it's essentially Christian theology anyway, that view of man."

Kubrick appeared to believe that freedom and social libertarianism is still worth pursuing even if mankind is ultimately ignoble, and that evil on the part of the individual—however undesirable—is still preferable in contrast to the evil of a totalitarian society. Kubrick said in an interview with Gene Siskel:

To restrain man is not to redeem him... I think the danger is not that authority will collapse, but that, finally, in order to preserve itself, it will become very repressive... Law and order is not a phony issue, not just an excuse for the Right to go further right.

In Kubrick's interview with Playboy, Eric Nordern brought up the notion that critics saw "not only a deep pessimism but also a kind of misanthropy" in his work, bringing up a suggestion by one reviewer that the ending of Dr. Strangelove suggested "the earth were being cleansed of an infection", to which Kubrick responded:

Good God, no. You don’t stop being concerned with man because you recognize his essential absurdities and frailties and pretensions. To me, the only real immorality is that which endangers the species; and the only absolute evil, that which threatens its annihilation. In the deepest sense, I believe in man’s potential and in his capacity for progress. In Strangelove, I was dealing with the inherent irrationality in man that threatens to destroy him; that irrationality is with us as strongly today, and must be conquered. But a recognition of insanity doesn’t imply a celebration of it—nor a sense of despair and futility about the possibility of curing it.

In that interview Nordern also asked "Do you believe that some form of all-powerful world government, or some radically new social, political and economic system, could deal intelligently and farsightedly with such problems as nuclear war?", and Kubrick replied that he saw no better alternative to democracy:

Well, none of the present systems has worked very well, but I don’t know what we’d replace them with. The idea of a group of philosopher kings running everything with benign and omniscient paternalism is always attractive, but where do we find the philosopher kings? And if we do find them, how do we provide for their successors? No, it has to be conceded that democratic society, with all its inherent strains and contradictions, is unquestionably the best system anyone ever worked out. I believe it was Churchill who once remarked that democracy is the worst social system in the world, except for all the others.

== Religion ==
Kubrick came from a secular family background and "was known to have said that he was not really a Jew, he just happened to have two Jewish parents." Though his father's legal name was Jacob, he went by Jacques or Jack as a move towards American assimilation. When asked by Michel Ciment in an interview if he had a religious upbringing, Kubrick replied: "No, not at all."

In Kubrick's interview with Craig McGregor, he said:

2001 would give a little insight into my metaphysical interests... I'd be very surprised if the universe wasn't full of an intelligence of an order that to us would seem God-like. I find it very exciting to have a semi-logical belief that there's a great deal to the universe we don't understand, and that there is an intelligence of an incredible magnitude outside the Earth. It's something I've become more and more interested in. I find it a very exciting and satisfying hope.

When asked in Eric Nordern's Playboy interview if 2001: A Space Odyssey was a religious film, Kubrick elaborated:

I will say that the God concept is at the heart of 2001 but not any traditional, anthropomorphic image of God. I don't believe in any of Earth's monotheistic religions, but I do believe that one can construct an intriguing scientific definition of God, once you accept the fact that there are approximately 100 billion stars in our galaxy alone, that each star is a life-giving sun and that there are approximately 100 billion galaxies in just the visible universe. Given a planet in a stable orbit, not too hot and not too cold, and given a few billion years of chance chemical reactions created by the interaction of a sun's energy on the planet's chemicals, it's fairly certain that life in one form or another will eventually emerge. It's reasonable to assume that there must be, in fact, countless billions of such planets where biological life has arisen, and the odds of some proportion of such life developing intelligence are high. Now, the sun is by no means an old star, and its planets are mere children in cosmic age, so it seems likely that there are billions of planets in the universe not only where intelligent life is on a lower scale than man but other billions where it is approximately equal and others still where it is hundreds of thousands of millions of years in advance of us. When you think of the giant technological strides that man has made in a few millennia—less than a microsecond in the chronology of the universe—can you imagine the evolutionary development that much older life forms have taken? They may have progressed from biological species, which are fragile shells for the mind at best, into immortal machine entities—and then, over innumerable eons, they could emerge from the chrysalis of matter transformed into beings of pure energy and spirit. Their potentialities would be limitless and their intelligence ungraspable by humans.

In the same interview, he also blames the poor critical reaction to 2001 as follows:

Perhaps there is a certain element of the lumpen literati that is so dogmatically atheist and materialist and Earth-bound that it finds the grandeur of space and the myriad mysteries of cosmic intelligence anathema.

In a 1969 interview to American Cinematographer, Kubrick said:

The whole idea of god is absurd. If anything, 2001 shows that what some people call "god" is simply an acceptable term for their ignorance. What they don't understand, they call "god"... Everything we know about the universe reveals that there is no god. I chose to do Dr. Arthur C. Clarke's story as a film because it highlights a critical factor necessary for human evolution; that is, beyond our present condition. This film is a rejection of the notion that there is a god; isn't that obvious?

He also commented on people who saw religious or spiritual connotations in 2001:

It's simply not there, religion and spirituality. Sufficiently advanced beings could be capable of things we might not even be able to understand — though these things would all make perfect sense to an advanced civilization, I suspect that these people to whom you refer are simply calling what they don't understand in my film "god".

In an interview with William Kloman of The New York Times, when asked why there is hardly any dialogue in 2001, Kubrick explained:

I don't have the slightest doubt that to tell a story like this, you couldn't do it with words. There are only 46 minutes of dialogue scenes in the film, and 113 of non-dialogue. There are certain areas of feeling and reality—or unreality or innermost yearning, whatever you want to call it—which are notably inaccessible to words. Music can get into these areas. Painting can get into them. Non-verbal forms of expression can. But words are a terrible straitjacket. It's interesting how many prisoners of that straitjacket resent its being loosened or taken off. There's a side to the human personality that somehow senses that wherever the cosmic truth may lie, it doesn't lie in A, B, C, D. It lies somewhere in the mysterious, unknowable aspects of thought and life and experience. Man has always responded to it. Religion, mythology, allegories—it's always been one of the most responsive chords in man. With rationalism, modern man has tried to eliminate it, and successfully dealt some pretty jarring blows to religion. In a sense, what's happening now in films and in popular music is a reaction to the stifling limitations of rationalism. One wants to break out of the clearly arguable, demonstrable things which really are not very meaningful, or very useful or inspiring, nor does one even sense any enormous truth in them.

Stephen King recalled Kubrick calling him late at night while he was filming The Shining and Kubrick asked him, "Do you believe in God?" King said that he had answered in the affirmative, but has had three different versions of what happened next. One time, he said that Kubrick simply hung up on him. On other occasions, he claimed Kubrick said, "I knew it", and then hung up on him. On yet another occasion, King claimed that Kubrick said, before hanging up, "No, I don't think there is a God."

Finally, Katharina Kubrick Hobbs was asked by alt.movies.kubrick if Stanley Kubrick believed in God. Here is her response:

Hmm, tricky. I think he believed in something, if you understand my meaning. He was a bit of a fatalist actually, but he was also very superstitious. Truly a mixture of nature and nurture. I don't know exactly what he believed, he probably would have said that no-one can really ever know for sure, and that it would be rather arrogant to assume that one could know. I asked him once after The Shining, if he believed in ghosts. He said that it would be nice if there "were" ghosts, as that would imply that there is something after death. In fact, I think he said, "Gee I hope so." ...He did not have a religious funeral service. He's not buried in consecrated ground. We always celebrated Christmas and had huge Christmas trees.

In Stanley Kubrick: A Life in Pictures, Jack Nicholson recalls that Kubrick said The Shining is an overall optimistic story because "anything that says there's anything after death is ultimately an optimistic story." Stephen King recounts hearing the same thing from Kubrick in conversation with him, and replied, "What about hell?" King says there was a pause and Kubrick answered, "I do not believe in hell."
