= Zoomorphism =

Type of art

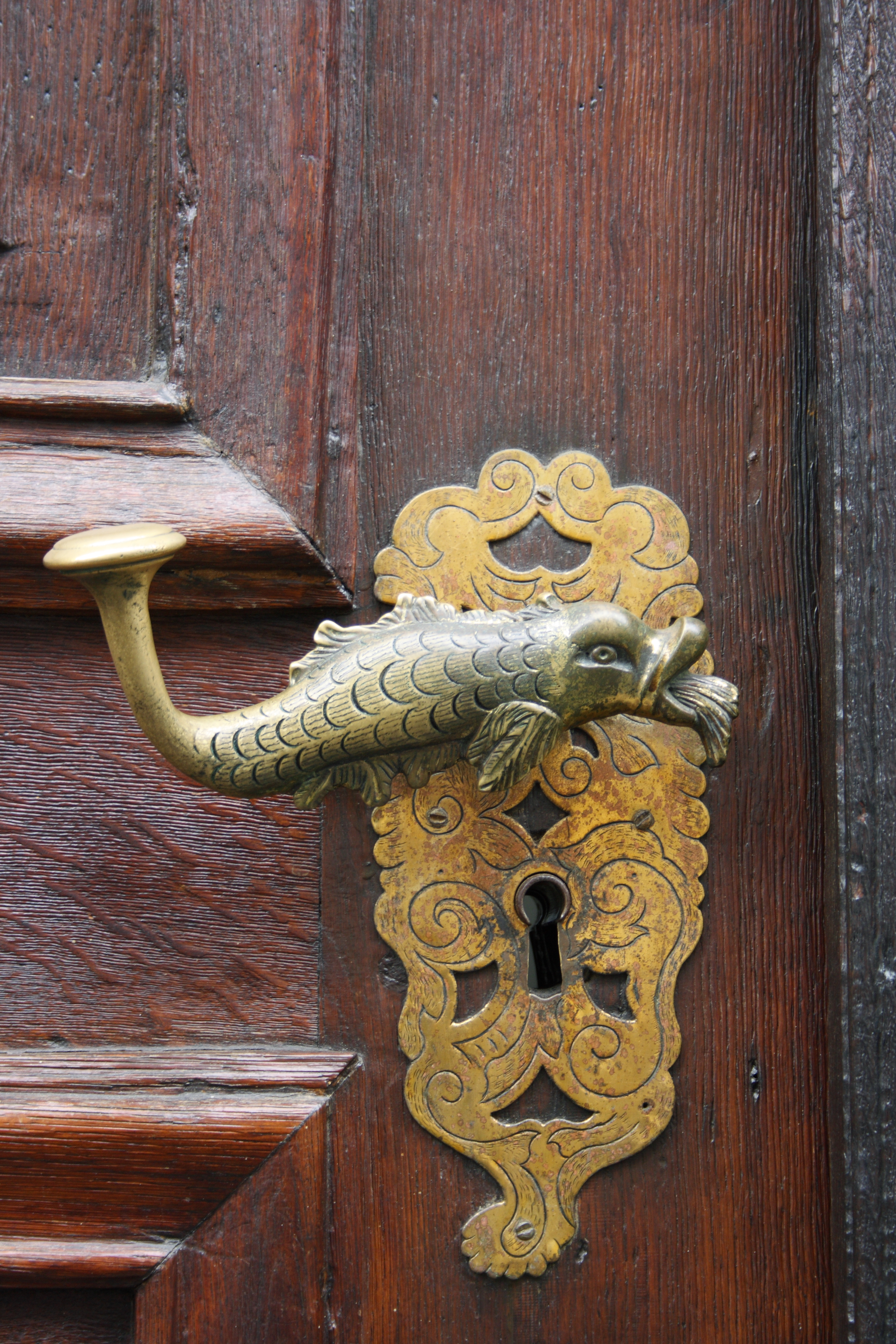
Fish-shaped door handle from Germany, an example of a zoomorphic artwork

In the context of art, zoomorphism (from the Ancient Greek words ζῶον (zōon) meaning "animal" and μορφή (morphē) meaning "shape") describes art that imagines humans as non-human animals. It can also be defined as art that portrays one species of animal like another species of animal, or art that uses animals as a visual motif, sometimes referred to as "animal style".

It is also similar to the term 'therianthropy', which is the ability to shapeshift into animal form, except that with zoomorphism the animal form is applied to a physical object. It broadly means to attribute animal forms or animal characteristics to other animals, humans, or non-animal things; similar to the concept of anthropomorphism, which applies human characteristics to animals or other non-human things. It is also used in literature to portray of humans or objects with animalistic behavior or features. The depiction of deities in animal form (theriomorphism) is an example of zoomorphism in a religious context. The use of zoomorphism can also serve as a decorative element to objects that are typically quite simple in shape or design.

The 'Cockerel' diadem, from Calouste Gulbenkian Museum (Lisbon, Portugal), made between 1897 and 1898 by René Lalique

Calligram of a tiger in Arabic, an example of zoomorphic calligraphy

== Examples ==
=== Zoomorphic representation in religion ===
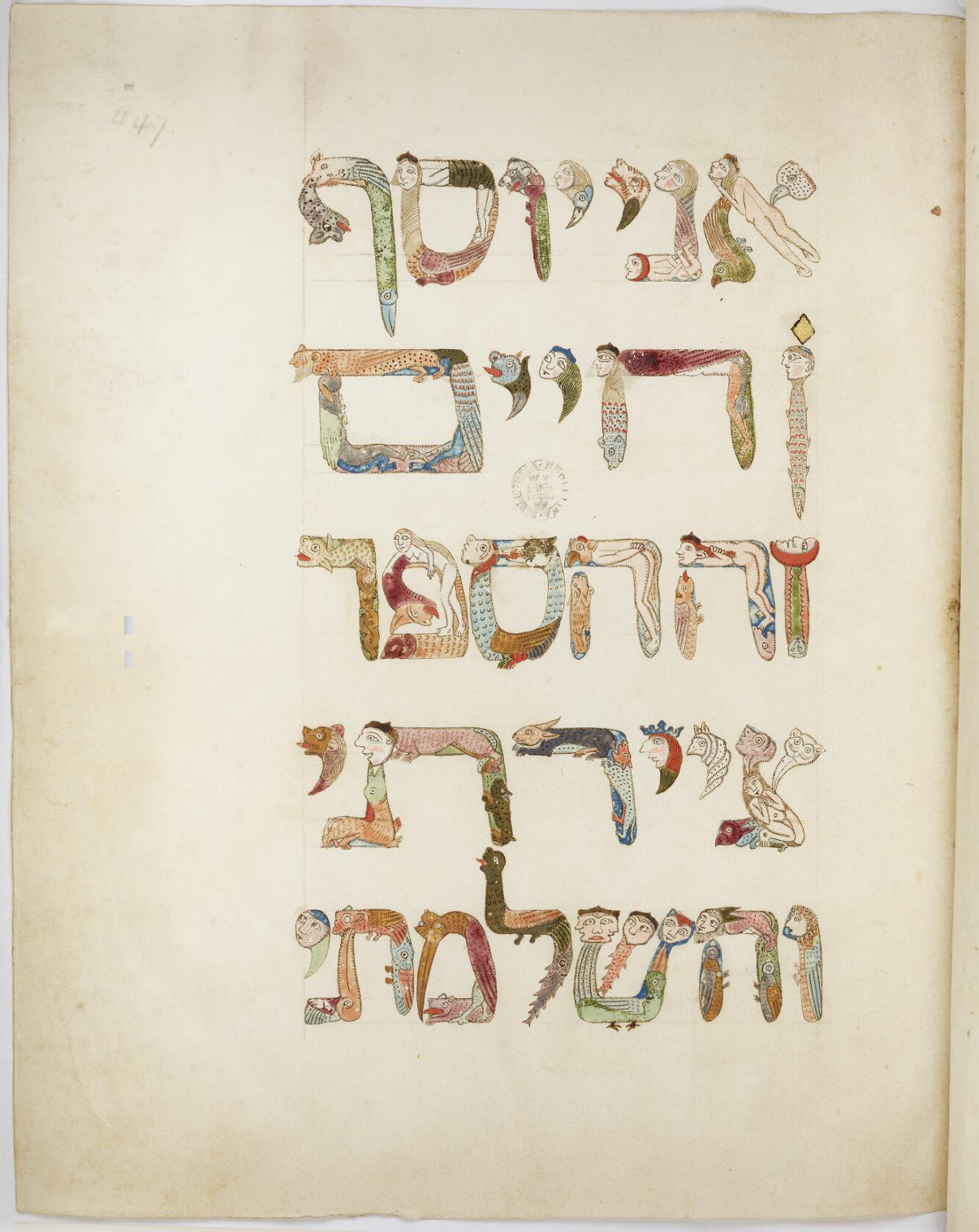
Zoomorphic and anthropomorphic letters in the Kennicott Bible

- The appearance of the Holy Spirit like a dove in the New Testament (The Gospel According to Luke 3: 22), "and the Holy Spirit descended on him in bodily form like a dove..."
- Mark the Evangelist as a lion in later Christian iconography.
- In Hinduism Vishnu's vahana Garuda is depicted as an eagle or kite or with half kite and half human body.
- The Egyptian gods were often depicted as zoomorphic or as hybrid.
- The names of the two most prominent Hebrew Bible female prophets – Deborah and Huldah – were in the Babylonian Talmud interpreted in zoomorphic terms as "wasp" and "weasel".
- Zoomorphic and anthropomorphic letters were used in some religious manuscripts, such as the Kennicott Bible.

=== Zoomorphic language for things, ideas, surnames and insults ===
- A literary phrase such as "The roar of a lion".
- An insult such as "You swine!" and "Feed on our flesh and blood you capitalist hyenas: it is your funeral feast!".
- A simile such as "His friend is as hungry as a wolf".
- A metaphor such as "He is an ugly toad".
- William Hogarth's name is a metonym for a swineherd.
- Waterwolf, a Dutch terminology for the tendency of bodies of water in low-lying land to grow larger over time, causing death, loss of livestock and loss of land.
- Sin lurking like a beast waiting to devour Cain in Genesis.

=== Humanity portrayed in evolutionary context ===
Desmond Morris in The Naked Ape and The Human Zoo, Robert Ardrey in African Genesis and Konrad Lorenz in On Aggression all wrote from a sociobiological perspective. They viewed the human species as an animal, subject to the evolutionary law of Survival of the fittest through adaptation to the biophysical environment.

=== Zoomorphic representation in Islamic art ===
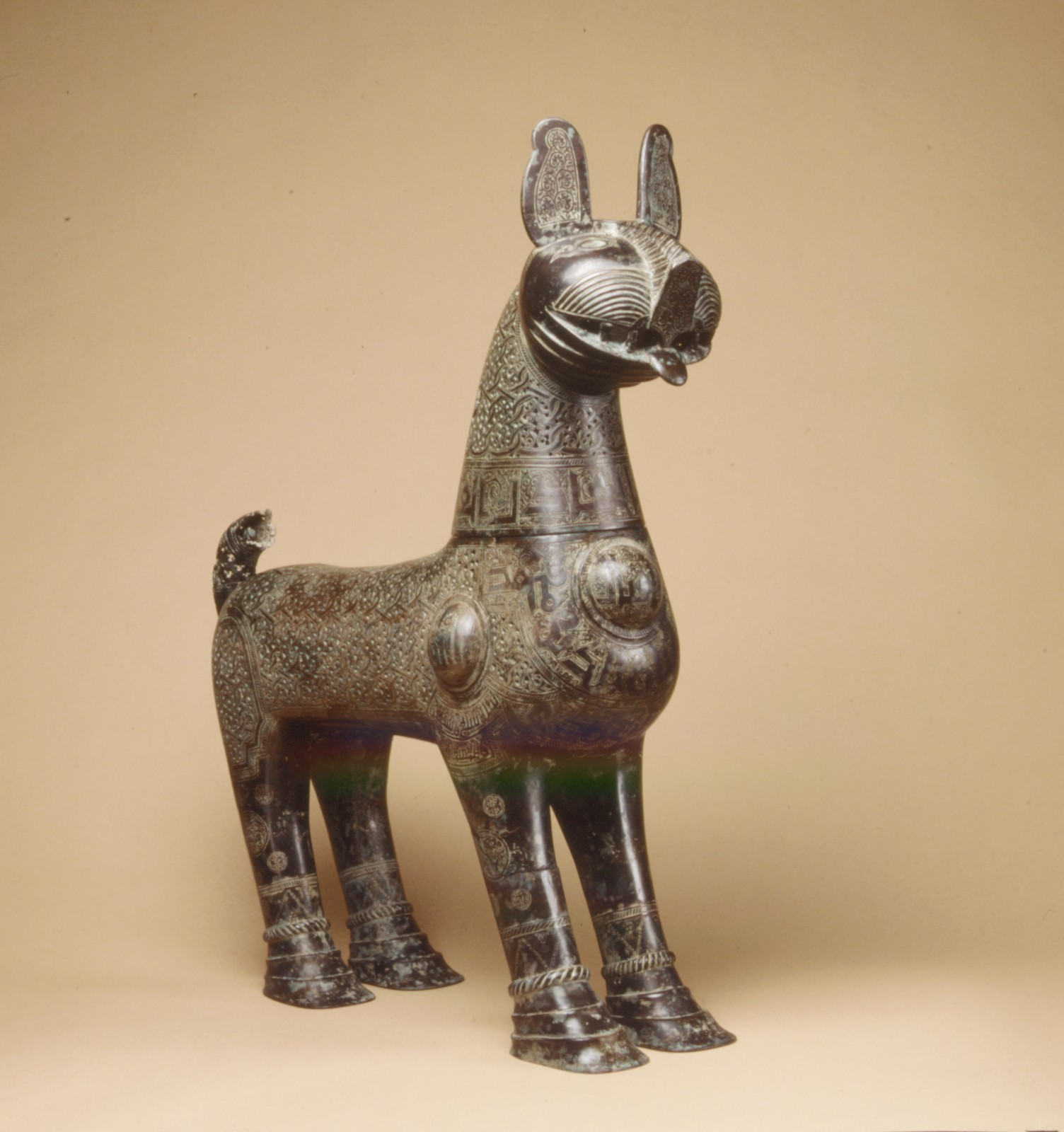
Incense Burner of Amir Saif al-Dunya wa’l-Din ibn Muhammad al-Mawardi, dated A.H. 577/ A.D. 1181–82, created by Ja`far ibn Muhammad ibn `Ali, made of bronze; cast, engraved, chased, pierced, H: 33 1/2 in. L: 32 1/2 in. W: 9 in.

One example of a zoomorphic object is the incense burner of Amir Saif al-Dunya wa’l-Din ibn Muhammad al-Mawardi, today located at the Metropolitan Museum in New York. Incense burners were common objects for zoomorphic forms that served as a container for aromatic material to be burned. This particular object comes from the Seljuq period in Iran. It is made of bronze, meaning it was a more expensive object as metalwork incense burners cost more to produce and were less common than other productions made of clay or soft stones. The work is meant to depict a lion or large cat. The artist plays with the anatomical elements of the body to fit the use for burning incense. Around the base of neck shows the area where the head is designed to be removed for the insertion of coal and incense. Throughout the body small holes were punctured for the release of the smoke. This object would have been found in a domestic space due to the animal-like imagery.

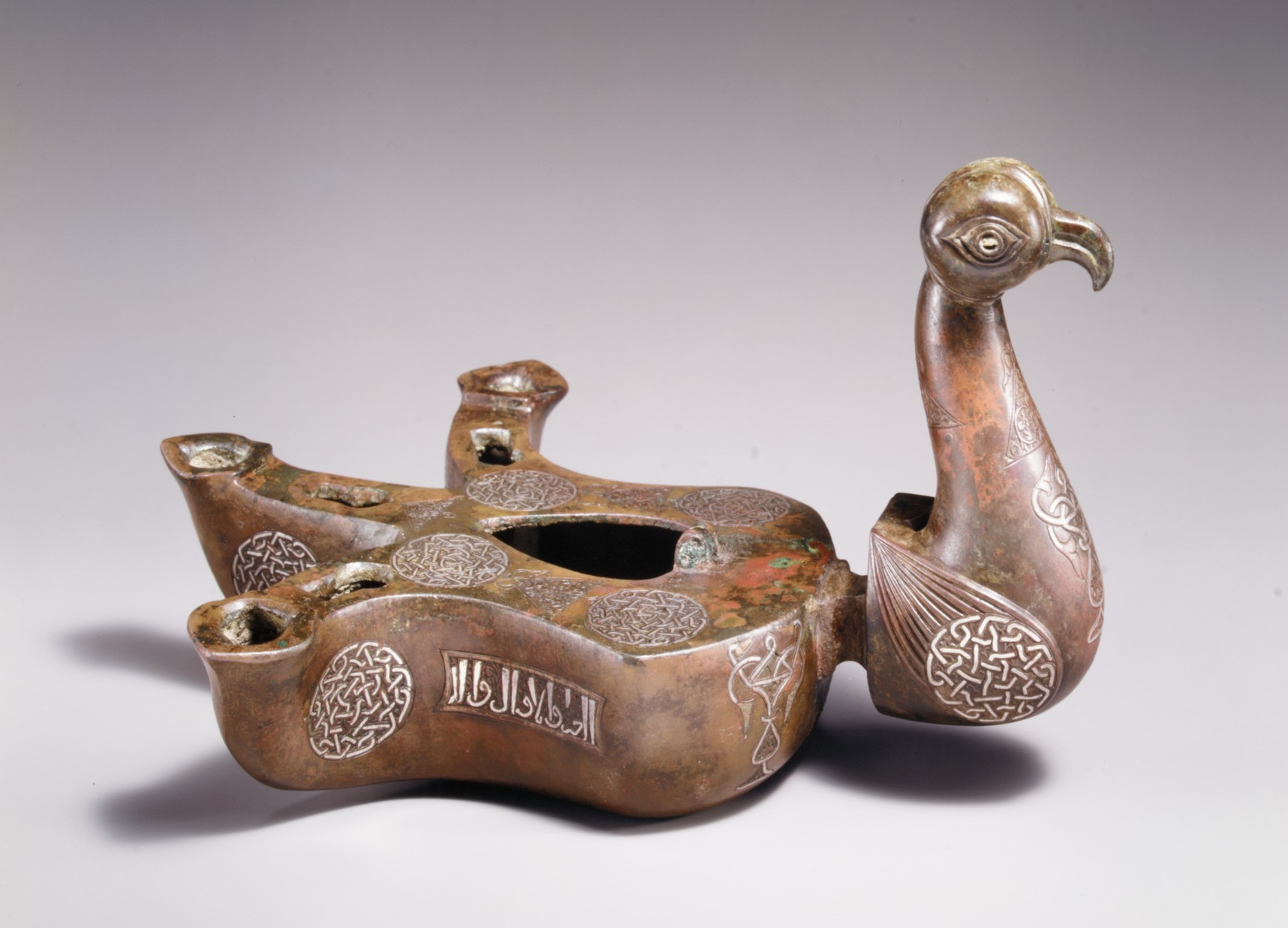
Bird-shaped oil lamp, dated late 12th-early 13th century, made of bronze; cast, engraved, inlaid with silver and copper, H: 8 in. L: 9 3/8 in. W: 11 13/16 in.

Another example of zoomorphism in Islamic art is the bird-shaped oil lamp, located at the Metropolitan Museum of Art in New York. The oil lamp would have been used as an everyday object in a domestic space as well. The handle of the lamp is depicted by the head and neck of the bird. The body takes the form of the base of the lamp where oil can be poured in the small opening. The artist uses the form of the bird to utilize the lamp either hanging or resting. There are keyholes on either side of the body for the lamp to be hung by a chain and the flat base allows for the lamp to be placed on any smooth surface. The similarities between the incense burner and the lamp demonstrate how zoomorphism was used throughout Islamic culture.

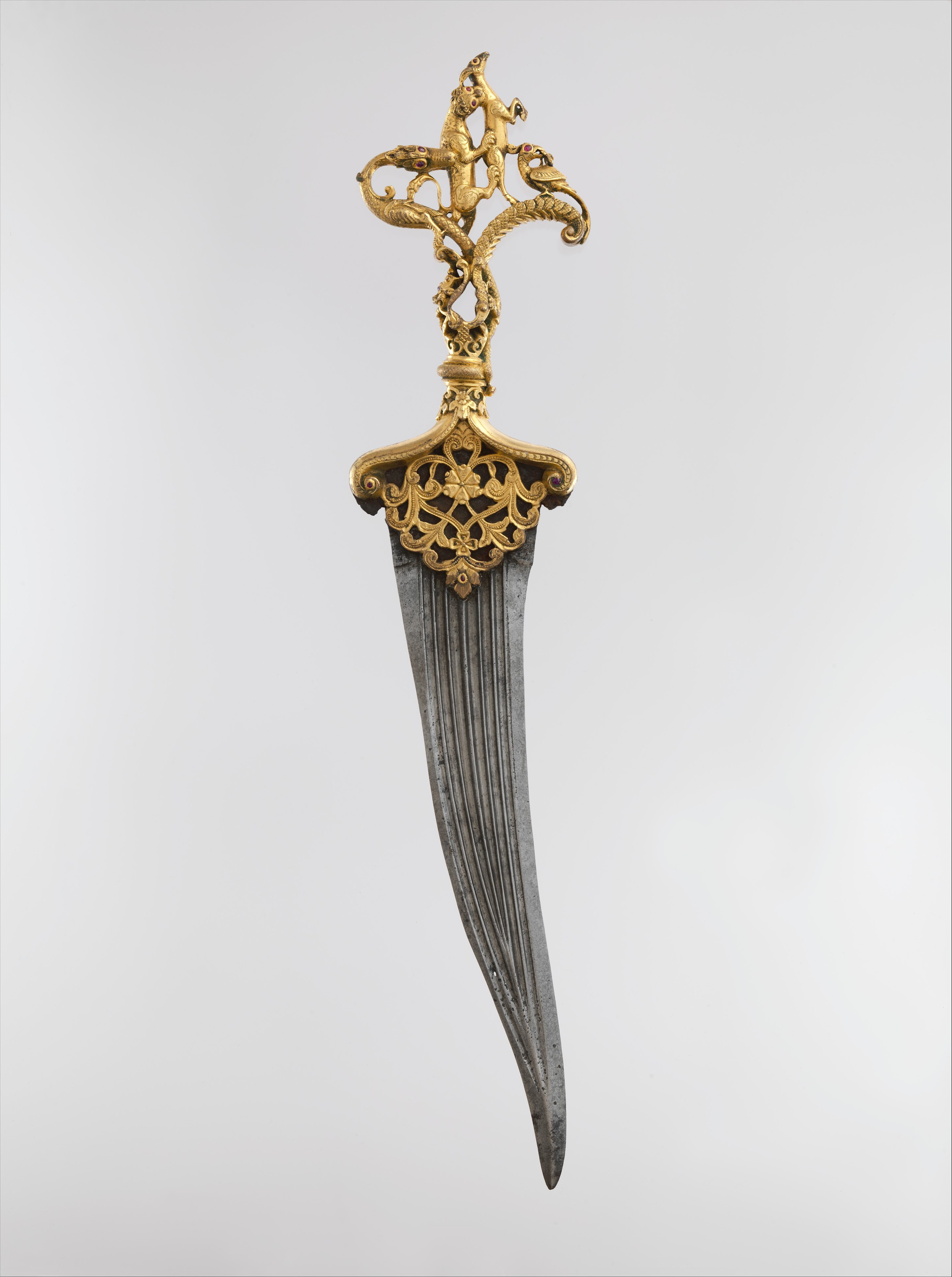
Dagger with Zoomorphic Hilt, dated to the second half 16th century, Hilt made of copper; cast, chased, gilded, and inlaid with rubies, Blade made of steel; forged, L: 15 5/8 in.

Zoomorphism appears on objects beyond household items. An example of this is the Dagger with Zoomorphic Hilt also located at the Metropolitan Museum of Art in New York. The hilt or handle of the dagger merges into the shape of a dragon attacking a lion who is performing the same act onto a deer. Each attacking animal is connected by its claws and teeth to form the handle. The inclusion of Persian and Indian symbols of power was common in zoomorphic imagery on hilts of daggers. In this dagger there is a figure of a bird in front of the deer who is meant to represent the Indian deity Garuda. Due to the intricate design and craftsmanship of this dagger, it would most likely not have been used for the purposes of a weapon, but rather as a ceremonial object. Many of the weapons included in Islamic art served as symbols for power and wealth.

=== Other ===
- Fenrisulfr, a wolf in Norse mythology
- Airavata, the king god of elephants in Indian mythology.
- Paw feet bathtub, with feet in the shape of a lion's paws.
- The sphinx from Sophocles' "Oedipus Rex".
- Elephantine Colossus, a hotel.
- Aslan in The Lion, the Witch and the Wardrobe is a lion that is the king of Narnia.
- Robotic pets, like AIBO, modeled on dogs or other animals.
- In 2010 city planners from Southern Sudan, which would become independent a year later, unveiled plans for the city center of its capital, Juba, to be built in the shape of a rhinoceros. The city of Wau was to be transformed in the shape of a giraffe.
- Close-mid back unrounded vowel, the only Latin letter in the shape of a ram's horn.

== See also ==
- Amity-enmity complex
- Anthropocentrism
- Dehumanization

== Bibliography ==
- Reaney, P. H.; Wilson, R. M. (1995). A Dictionary of English Surnames:The Standard Guide to English Surnames. Oxford University Press. ISBN 0-19-863146-4.
