= The Social Contract (Ardrey book) =

1970 book by Robert Ardrey

The Social Contract: A Personal Inquiry into the Evolutionary Sources of Order and Disorder
- Author: Robert Ardrey
- Illustrator: Berdine Ardrey (née Grunewald)
- Language: English
- Series: Nature of Man Series
- Subjects: Paleoanthropology; Human evolution
- Published: (1970) Atheneum; (2014) StoryDesign LTD.
- Media type: Print
- Pages: 404
- ISBN: 978-0689103476
- Preceded by: The Territorial Imperative
- Followed by: The Hunting Hypothesis

The Social Contract: A Personal Inquiry into the Evolutionary Sources of Order and Disorder is a 1970 book by Robert Ardrey. It is the third in his four-book Nature of Man Series.

The book extended Ardrey's refutation of the prevailing conviction within social sciences that all social behavior is purely learned and not governed by innate patterns. Through interwoven analyses of animals and human social structures Ardrey argued that inherited evolutionary traits are an important determining factor in social behavior.

Ardrey dedicated The Social Contract to Jean-Jacques Rousseau, after whose 1762 work the book was titled.

== Overview ==
The Social Contract was published in 1970. It was the third book in Ardrey's Nature of Man series, following African Genesis (1961) and The Territorial Imperative (1966) and preceding The Hunting Hypothesis (1976).

The Social Contract continues Ardrey's work on understanding how evolutionarily inherited traits are manifest by contemporary man. In particular The Social Contract examines society and hierarchy in terms of genetic diversity. The edition cites many of the scientists who were important influences on Ardrey, including Raymond Dart and Konrad Lorenz. It was illustrated, like the first two books, by Ardrey's wife, the South African actress and illustrator Berdine Ardrey (née Grunewald).

The Social Contract is a more ideologically motivated book than the other works in his Nature of Man series. It made assertions about how the social contract should be organized based on the evolutionary nature of man. In his last chapter, Ardrey writes:

The evolutionary nature of man represents, as I see it, a subject for the new philosophy, the new theologian. A set of common assumptions, common dedications, common assurances, of rules and regulations, even considering the limitations of homo sapiens, remains someday possible. As all of our parochial dedications have been eroded by the wash of the science, still a religion unassailable by the sciences exists as a goal worthy of contemporary ambition.

The Social Contract also called for a reasoned respect of nature (in his next book, The Hunting Hypothesis, Ardrey would be one of the first to warn of climate change as an existential threat to humanity). In The Social Contract he writes:

The philosophy of the impossible has been the dominant motive in human affairs for the past two centuries. We have pursued the mastery of nature as if we ourselves were not a portion of that nature. We have boasted of our command over our physical environment while we ourselves have done our urgent best to destroy it.

== Controversy ==
Compared to the other works in the Nature of Man series, The Social Contract inspired more controversy and received more negative reviews. Furthermore, the central theses of the other three books have come to be commonly accepted in scientific communities: African Genesis (1961) posited that humans evolved from African meat-eaters instead of Asian carnivores; The Territorial Imperative (1966) demonstrated the influence of inherited territorial instincts on social formations; and The Hunting Hypothesis (1976) showed the importance of hunting behavior on the evolutionary course of early man. Because the core of the book is a social proposal and not a scientific hypothesis this is not the case with The Social Contract.

Part of the controversy surrounding The Social Contract had to do with its theses on inequality. According to Ardrey, because each individual is born with a unique combination of genetically-determined traits, these traits can be evaluated by the environment, and therefore the diversity of phenotypes becomes inequality. For Ardrey the only way to have a realistic optimism about society was to recognize this inequality. In the words of the reviewer for News/Check, "A society of equals, Ardrey argues, is a natural impossibility — things just don't work that way, and those who argue otherwise (conservatives as well as liberals) are denying possibilities of change; they also deny, and this is important to Ardrey, optimism."

Ardrey argued, therefore, that inequality was not necessarily a social evil, but he emphasized that it could only be justly expressed given absolute equality of opportunity. He also applied evolutionary theory on the level of groups, a move that continues to be scientifically controversial.

In addition to insisting on the necessity for absolute equality of opportunity, Ardrey argued that the presence of inequality does not justify the domination of the weak by the strong. Rather "Ardrey showed that in all societies at any level of the animal world, structures exist to protect the vulnerable, and that this is an evolutionary advantage as it protects diversity, diversity being essential for creativity."

== Legacy ==
The central thesis of Ardrey's series, namely that evolutionary characteristics are manifest in human social relations, has become widely accepted. This shift signaled a major change in the social sciences, particularly in social and cultural anthropology and sociology. Robert Wokler, on the importance of Ardrey's approach, wrote:

What ought to be studied, according to Ardrey, are the relations between individuals that stem from the innate and universal attributes of animal life, whereas cultural anthropologists who detect a fundamental discontinuity between mankind and other zoological species are just impervious to the revolutionary ideas of Darwinism which have reverberated throughout all the life sciences apart from their own.

In 1972, defending his movie A Clockwork Orange from Fred M. Hechinger, Stanley Kubrick cited Ardrey. In particular, he quoted The Social Contract (along with African Genesis). Kubrick was a notable fan of Ardrey's work, and also cited him as an inspiration for his 1968 film, 2001: A Space Odyssey.
