= The Territorial Imperative =

1966 nonfiction work by Robert Ardrey

The Territorial Imperative: A Personal Inquiry Into the Animal Origins of Property and Nations
- Author: Robert Ardrey
- Illustrator: Berdine Ardrey
- Language: English
- Series: Nature of Man Series
- Publication date: 1966
- Pages: 400
- ISBN: 1568361440
- Preceded by: African Genesis
- Followed by: The Social Contract

The Territorial Imperative: A Personal Inquiry Into the Animal Origins of Property and Nations is a 1966 nonfiction book by American writer Robert Ardrey. It characterizes an instinct among humans toward territoriality and the implications of this to property ownership and nation building. The Territorial Imperative was influential at the time, and encouraged public interest in human origins.

The Territorial Imperative is the second book in Ardrey's Nature of Man Series; it is preceded by African Genesis (1961) and followed by The Social Contract (1970) and The Hunting Hypothesis (1976). It was illustrated by Ardrey's wife, the South African actress and illustrator Berdine Ardrey (née Grunewald). Ardrey dedicated The Territorial Imperative to Henry Eliot Howard, who was noted for being one of the first to describe in detail the territorial behaviors of birds.

== Synopsis ==
The Territorial Imperative develops the theses originally introduced in African Genesis: A Personal Investigation into the Animal Origins and Nature of Man, which was published five years earlier. In African Genesis, Ardrey posited that man originated in Africa instead of Asia, that he is driven by inherited instincts to acquire land and defend territory, and that the development of weapons was a fundamental turning point in his evolution. The Territorial Imperative further explores these ideas with a special emphasis on man's distinct preoccupation with the concept of territory. It goes on to elucidate the role that plays in modern human society in phenomena such as property ownership and nation building.

== Controversy ==
The Territorial Imperative caused significant scientific and popular controversy. In it Ardrey restated and developed his challenge to the reigning methodological assumption of the social sciences, that human behavior is fundamentally distinct from animal behavior. As he writes in The Territorial Imperative, "The dog barking at you from behind his master's fence acts for a motive indistinguishable from that of his master when the fence was built." Robert Wokler wrote of Ardrey's challenge to the established life sciences:

What ought to be studied, according to Ardrey, are the relations between individuals that stem from the innate and universal attributes of animal life, whereas cultural anthropologists who detect a fundamental discontinuity between mankind and other zoological species are just impervious to the revolutionary ideas of Darwinism which have reverberated throughout all the life sciences apart from their own.

In 1968, two years after the publication of The Territorial Imperative, Ashley Montagu organized fourteen scientists to write essays in opposition to Ardrey's work (and the similarly aligned work of Konrad Lorenz, On Aggression). That volume became Man and Aggression. Montagu would eventually edit another volume in opposition to Ardrey, and the increasingly heated debate stirred popular interest in human origins. By Carmel Schrire's account, "Ashley Montagu edited two collections of writings aimed at countering the views of both Ardrey and Konrad Lorenz. ... Despite this, Ardrey's popularity did not flag, and his writings opened the fields of paleoanthropology, ethnology, and anthropology to a wide readership."

The opposition of these two viewpoints became a major theme in the social science of the time. Robin Fox, who authored The Imperial Animal (1972) with Lionel Tiger, wrote of the opposition:

I was a great friend of Robert Ardrey, and had been known publicly to defend his name and honor from the assault of the anti-Ardreyites, including Ashley Montagu. ... Ashley Montagu always carefully distanced himself from what he thought were our erroneous conclusions about human aggression. We returned the favor, even calling him and his school "the Christian Scientists of anthropology" for their refusal to accept the reality of human evil: that it was an essential part of being human and could not be just wished away. We in turn were included eventually among the villains in his "new litany of innate depravity." And so it went.

Some essays in the Montagu volume, as well as much other criticism of Ardrey's work, claimed that, because it asserted the role of instinctual aggression in determining man's behavior, his work excused aggression or saw the human as innately evil. Ardrey differed, claiming instead that an awareness of human nature was necessary to truly pursue civilization. For example, Ardrey, in a 1971 Penthouse interview, asserted "I don't think human beings are that bad at all—I think they are absolutely marvellous. We've got to stop kidding ourselves, stop lying to ourselves, living with a delusion about ourselves."

== Criticism ==
A 1966 review by Edmund Leach said Ardrey was "a mine of scientific-sounding misinformation" and his book was "noisy and foolish".

A 1967 review by Patrick Bateson said "The arguments on which he bases his conclusions are shot through with such elementary mistakes, and his definitions are so loose, that he will surely mislead anyone who takes him seriously . . . Ardrey seems to be scarcely aware of the interactions involved in biological processes and to know nothing of the scientific method."

A 1970 review by Carroll Quigley said "Ardrey pretends to be a scientist, or at least a science reporter; but in this book there is no more science than there is in a comic strip . . . It is true that Ardrey has read a great deal about animal behavior, but he never seems to grasp what it all means, and his biases prevent him from seeing what is really there."

A 1970 review by C. E. S. Franks said "however well written they may be, his books are neither scientific works nor the works of a scientist. Robert Ardrey has misunderstood two of the basic concepts of the new biology, "aggression" and "territory", and has misapplied them in discussing human society".

== Legacy ==
The Territorial Imperative was widely read and exerted a cultural influence. It quickly became an international bestseller and was translated into dozens of languages. Ardrey's work in general, and The Territorial Imperative in particular, is often credited with arousing popular interest in ethology, anthropology, and human origins. Geoffrey Gorer, for example, in his Encounter review of The Territorial Imperative, writes: "Almost without question, Robert Ardrey is today the most influential writer in English dealing with the innate or instinctive attributes of human nature, and the most skilled populariser of the findings of paleo-anthropologists, ethologists, and biological experimenters." Ralph Graves claims "[Ardrey] today can claim major credit for having introduced the public to the new field of ethology, the study of animal behavior and its relationship to man." Commenting upon Ardrey's legacy on the occasion of his death, the South African anthropologist Dr. Phillip Tobias stated, "He has made an incalculable contribution to the science of human evolution. Thousands of people around the world, especially in the United States, were made aware of the fascination and the importance of studies on man's place in nature [through his writing]."

The work influenced several notable figures. Stanley Kubrick cited Ardrey as an inspiration for his films 2001: A Space Odyssey (1968) and A Clockwork Orange (1971). The strategic analyst Andrew Marshall and U.S. Secretary of Defense James Schlesinger are known to have discussed The Territorial Imperative in connection to military-strategic thinking.

Ardrey went on to publish two more books on human origins and the nature of man, The Social Contract: A Personal Inquiry into the Evolutionary Sources of Order and Disorder (1970) and The Hunting Hypothesis: A Personal Conclusion Concerning the Evolutionary Nature of Man (1976). He continued to publish influential works in the field of anthropology until his death in 1980.
