= African Genesis =

1961 nonfiction work by Robert Ardrey

African Genesis: A Personal Investigation into the Animal Origins and Nature of Man
- Author: Robert Ardrey
- Illustrator: Berdine Ardrey (née Grunewald)
- Language: English
- Series: Nature of Man Series
- Publication date: 1961
- Pages: 380
- ISBN: 0002110148
- Followed by: The Territorial Imperative

African Genesis: A Personal Investigation into the Animal Origins and Nature of Man is a 1961 nonfiction work by the American writer Robert Ardrey. It expounded on the killer ape theory, positing the hypothesis that man evolved on the African continent from carnivorous, predatory ancestors who distinguished themselves from apes by the use of weapons. The work bears on questions of human origins, human nature, and human uniqueness. Although some of his ideas were refuted by later science, it was widely read and continues to inspire significant controversy.

African Genesis is the first in Robert Ardrey's Nature of Man Series. It is followed by The Territorial Imperative (1966), The Social Contract (1970), and The Hunting Hypothesis (1976). It was illustrated by Ardrey's wife, the South African actress and illustrator Berdine Ardrey (née Grunewald).

== Background ==
Robert Ardrey, at the time a working playwright and screenwriter, travelled in 1955 to Africa, partly at the behest of Richard Foster Flint, to investigate claims made by Raymond Dart about a specimen of Australopithecus africanus.

He met Dart in March 1955. Dart, in his laboratory at Witwatersrand University Medical School, had assembled evidence for a controversial thesis. Among the collection were fossil baboon skulls from the caves of Taung, Sterkfontein and Makapan that he believed showed fractures caused by Australopithecus wielding bone clubs; the jaw of a juvenile ape-man from Makapansgat which had been fractured and lost its incisors; and 7,000 fossil bones from the Makapansgat cave. Among the fossils, skulls and lower leg bones were disproportionately represented, leading Dart to theorize that man's ancestors were hunters who used bones as weapons. His overall thesis was that "it was the ape-man's instinct for violence, and his successful development of lethal weapons, that gave him his dominance in the animal world from the very beginning. Those instincts are with us today." Ardrey was initially much taken by the theory. As a correspondent he wrote an article about it for The Reporter. After receiving significant attention the article was reprinted in Science Digest, which marked the beginning of the spread of popular notions about Australopithecus. The article in Science Digest also led to The Smithsonian Institution contacting Dart and eventually providing him funding to continue his research.

Following a visit by Dr. Kenneth P. Oakley Ardrey agreed to write a book on the subject. Oakley secured an office for Ardrey in the National History Museum in London, as well as access to its private libraries. Ardrey spent six years traveling between Northern universities and African archeological sites. During this time he worked with many notable scientists, including Louis Leakey (then affiliated with the Coryndon Museum in Kenya) and Tony Sutcliffe (then affiliated with the Royal Archaeological Institute).

Ardrey eventually came to be a vocal proponent of this thesis, introducing it, in modified form, to a broad audience with African Genesis. He added to it his own ideas about the role of territory in human behavior, about hierarchy in social animals, and about the instinctual status of the urge to dominate one's fellows.

== Legacy ==
African Genesis met with massive popular success and widespread recognition. It became an international bestseller and was translated into dozens of languages. In 1962 it was a finalist for the National Book Award in nonfiction. In 1969 Time magazine named African Genesis the most notable nonfiction book of the 1960s. The book has continued to bear on the popular imagination of human nature.

The theories of Dart and Ardrey flew in the face of prevailing theories of human origins. At the time of the publication of African Genesis it was generally agreed that human beings evolved from Asian ancestors. Furthermore, it was taken for granted that these ancestors were herbivorous. The idea of an African Genesis of humanity was met with fervent resistance in the scientific community.

On a grander scale, Ardrey challenged the reigning methodological assumption of the social sciences, that human behavior was fundamentally distinct from animal behavior. As he put it in his next book, The Territorial Imperative, "The dog barking at you from behind his master's fence acts for a motive indistinguishable from that of his master when the fence was built."

Following the publication of African Genesis Ardrey's theories became mired in controversy because of his notions about innate human violence and inherited instinctual aggression. (For more details, see The Territorial Imperative.) Later commentators, however, have come to emphasize the broader implications of Ardrey's theories; it is now commonly accepted that the controversy obscured the core of his thinking. William Wright, for example, writing in 2013, writes "Not only was Ardrey, with his three-million-year-old unsolved murders, claiming that evolution has saddled us with a battery of behavioral traits, but he was also reckless enough to emphasize the most repugnant, the killer impulse. This inflammatory claim certainly won Ardrey attention, but the angry controversy it provoked almost obscured the main point: that human behavior is as much a product of evolution as the human body."

While Ardrey's theses on aggression were controversial, he was also challenged on his conviction that the study of animal behavior is necessarily relevant to the study of human behavior. This precept has gained widespread acceptance and, due in large part to Ardrey's work, passed into the scientific commonsense. Following the 1961 publication of African Genesis the science of ethology, which is based on the methodological assumption of the cross-relevance of anthropology and zoology, underwent a massive flourishing. 1966 saw Lorenz's On Aggression published, followed by Desmond Morris's The Naked Ape in 1967, Lionel Tiger's Men in Groups in 1969, and Tiger and Fox's The Imperial Animal in 1971. Along with ethology's ascendence came a renaissance of its central premise—then much derided in scientific communities by blank-state theorists—that the study of animal behavior could tell us much about human behavior.

African Genesis led Ardrey into a long career of work in anthropology and ethology. Regarding his later-in-life return to science, Ardrey wrote "while peasant and poet may apprehend a truth, it is the obligation of science to define it, to prove it, to assimilate its substance into the body of scientific thought, and to make its conclusions both available and understandable to the society of which science is a part."

His writings on paleoanthropology, ethnology, and anthropology, along with the massive popular success of African Genesis, are widely credited with initiating public interest in these fields and sparking widespread popular debate about human nature as it is connected to human evolution. C.K. Brain, for example, writes:

African Genesis has, in all probability, been read by more people throughout the world than any other book on human evolution and the nature of man. Its influence has been very great indeed as it fermented an intense debate about these topics, and catalysed a new set of concepts in paleoanthropology.

Several scientists credit Ardrey's work, and African Genesis in particular, with launching them into their studies. Paleoanthropologist Rick Potts, who has been the director of the Smithsonian Institution Museum of Natural History's Human Origins Program since 1985 points to African Genesis as one of the two most formative books of his early years. In the 2015 PBS film documentary Dawn of Humanity, Potts recites the beginning of the book from memory.

In 1972, defending his film A Clockwork Orange from Fred M. Hechinger, Stanley Kubrick cited Ardrey. In particular, he quoted African Genesis (along with The Social Contract). Kubrick was a notable fan of Ardrey's work, and also cited him as an inspiration for his 1968 film, 2001: A Space Odyssey. Nonetheless, the behavior of the apes in the "Dawn of Man" sequence of 2001 has since been "proven false", since violent apes such as these have now been shown to be "vegetarians" instead—according to archeologist K. Kris Hirst in reviewing the 2015 PBS documentary film Dawn of Humanity, which describes, directly in the context of 2001, the 2015 studies of fossils of Homo naledi.

A.J. Jacobs, who wrote the 2004 book The Know-It-All, about reading the entire Encyclopædia Britannica, states in an interview that a quote from African Genesis was the most profound thing he read while reading the Encyclopædia.
