= Territorial Imperative =

Territorial Imperative may refer to:

- The Territorial Imperative, a 1966 nonfiction book by Robert Ardrey describing the evolutionarily determined instinct among humans toward territoriality
- The Northwest Territorial Imperative, a white separatist project of establishing a white ethnostate in Northwestern United States
