= Homo Necans =

1972 book by Walter Burkert

Homo Necans: The Anthropology of Ancient Greek Sacrificial Ritual and Myth
- Author: Walter Burkert
- Original title: Homo Necans: Interpretationen Altgriechischer Opferriten und Mythen
- Language: German
- Subject: Ancient Greek religion
- Publication date: 1972
- Publication place: Germany
- Media type: Print (Hardcover and Paperback)

Homo Necans: The Anthropology of Ancient Greek Sacrificial Ritual and Myth (German: Homo Necans: Interpretationen Altgriechischer Opferriten und Mythen) is a 1972 book on ancient Greek religion and mythology by the classicist Walter Burkert. It won the Weaver Award for Scholarly Literature, awarded by the Ingersoll Foundation, in 1992.

== Summary ==
Burkert's core thesis is that when paleolithic man became a hunter, in spite of the generally omnivorous orientation of the great apes, lack of a predator instinct was made up for by turning patterns of intra-species aggression against the prey: Homo necans means "man the killer". Thus, the animal hunted by ancient man automatically acquired aspects of an equal, as if it were of one of the hunter's relations. In a first attempt at applying ethology to religious history, Burkert confronts the power and effect of tradition in uncovering traces of ancient hunting rituals so motivated in historical animal sacrifice and human sacrifice (by his thesis unified as deriving from the same fundamental principle) in specific historical Greek rituals with relevance to human religious behaviour in general. Burkert acknowledges that a decisive impulse for the thesis derived from Konrad Lorenz' On Aggression (1963).

The thesis is an extension of the hunting hypothesis, which states that hunting as a means of obtaining food was a dominant influence on human evolution and cultural development (as opposed to gathering vegetation or scavenging). The guilt incurred in the violence of the hunt was reflected in sacred crimes, which through rituals of cleansing and expiation served to unify communities. Burkert supports his thesis by integrating a multitude of examples that elaborate primitive ritual as it is reflected in Greek mythology. He examines various cult-complexes in detail, confronting "sacrificial ritual with its tension between encountering death and affirming life, its external form consisting of preparations, a frightening central moment, and restitution", and affirming in detail the initial hypothesis.

== Reception ==
Homo Necans was conceived in the 1960s; it controversially introduced functionalism, along the lines of Jane Ellen Harrison's Themis, to a German audience, and employed a form of structuralism in interpreting complexes of ritual and festival, to apply some findings of ethology for the first time to mythology. René Girard's Violence and the Sacred appeared the same year. The book that was controversial at its first appearance was less revolutionary when it finally appeared in English, Burkert noted, in an introduction to the English translation (1983). The historian Peter Gay praised Homo Necans as a suggestive discussion of the impulse to revenge.

Robert Parker, in reviewing Homo Necans for The Times Literary Supplement, observed of Burkert that "boldness of theory and consummate learning are united in him as in few others". M.L. West, in Journal of Hellenic Studies, remarked that the book was "an exceptional intellectual experience".

== See also ==
- Killer ape theory
- Origin of religion
- Religious violence
