= The Hunting Hypothesis =

1976 nonfiction work by Robert Ardrey

The Hunting Hypothesis: A Personal Conclusion Concerning the Evolutionary Nature of Man
- First edition
- Author: Robert Ardrey
- Language: English
- Series: Nature of Man Series
- Subjects: Paleoanthropology; Human evolution
- Published: (1976) Atheneum Books; (2014) StoryDesign LTD.
- Media type: Print
- Pages: 231
- ISBN: 978-0988604384
- Preceded by: The Social Contract

The Hunting Hypothesis: A Personal Conclusion Concerning the Evolutionary Nature of Man (commonly known as The Hunting Hypothesis) is a 1976 work of paleoanthropology by Robert Ardrey. It is the final book in his widely read Nature of Man Series, which also includes African Genesis (1961) and The Territorial Imperative (1966).

The work deals with the ramifications of evolutionarily inherited traits in man, particularly those that developed through hunting. It was also one of the earliest books to warn about the possible dangers of climate change.

== Theories and controversy ==
Ardrey's main focus in The Hunting Hypothesis was to examine the ways in which human evolution developed with and because of hunting behavior, and the effects on modern man of inherited traits related to this evolution.

At the time of the publication of The Hunting Hypothesis there was still significant controversy surrounding the thesis that early man hunted for food. Ardrey's work was often attacked for its focus on human aggression. In particular, Ashley Montagu, representing a camp known as the "Blank State" theorists, who believed that man's behavior was entirely socially determined, marshaled fourteen scientists to refute Ardrey and his predecessors (chiefly Konrad Lorenz) in two volumes.

Though now generally accepted, the hypothesis that hunting behavior influenced the evolution of early man continued to inspire controversy. As late as 1997, PBS, in its series In Search of Human Origins cast aspersion on the notion that hunting was common in early man, asserting instead that early man was primarily a "highly successful scavenger."

== Legacy ==
Today, the theories propounded in The Hunting Hypothesis have come to be commonly accepted in the scientific community. In 2011 PBS reversed its earlier position. The special Becoming Human asserted:

Homo erectus probably hunted with close-quarters weapons, with spears that were thrown at animals from a short distance, clubs, thrown rocks, weapons like that. They weren’t using long distance projectile weapons that we know of. The Homo erectus hunt was simple but effective. It fed not just their larger brains, but the growing complexity of that early human society.

Scientific American wrote about the controversy:

For decades researchers have been locked in debate over how and when hunting began and how big a role it played in human evolution. Recent analyses of human anatomy, stone tools and animal bones are helping to fill in the details of this game-changing shift in subsistence strategy. This evidence indicates that hunting evolved far earlier than some scholars had envisioned – and profoundly impacted subsequent human evolution.

== Reception ==
Reviews of The Hunting Hypothesis were mixed; popular reviews tended to be generally positive, and scientific reviews tended to be polarized.

The famed biologist and naturalist E. O. Wilson, who notably advocated for Ardrey against his critics, effusively praised the book.

In his excellent new book Robert Ardrey continues as the lyric poet of human evolution, capturing the Homeric quality of the subject that so many scientists by and large feel but are unable to put into words. His opinions, like those in his earlier works, are controversial but more open, squarely stated, and closer to the truth than the protests of his most scandalized critics.

The anthropologist Colin Turnbull reviewed the book for The New York Times: "This is a sober, well-reasoned plea for a sane appraisal of the human situation, of a re-evaluation of man's nature, of where he has come from and, much more important, where he is going." He went on to call it a profoundly hopeful book, dispelling notions that Ardrey's work was pessimistic. "If there is any cause for pessimism it is not in the facts nor in Ardrey's account, but in man's demonstrated ability to ignore the lessons of history, and in his preference for short-term responses rather than long-term solutions."

The Hunting Hypothesis, which was the final book in Ardrey's Nature of Man series, was widely acknowledged as a fitting capstone to his work. Max Lerner, for instance, wrote that it was "Easily the best of Robert Ardrey's books. It is brilliant in its summary of recent findings, it is wonderfully persuasive in its argument about our essential human nature, and it makes a satisfying unity out of Ardrey's thinking in all his books." Roger D. Masters wrote that "The Hunting Hypothesis is probably Robert Ardrey's best book. ... His overall contribution to public understanding of an enormous range of scientific research is of the greatest importance." Antony Jay summarized the consensus:

If I believe that Robert Ardrey's books are the most important to be written since the war and arguably in the 20th century, it is because he has satisfied to a quite unbelievable degree the demands of the ignorant layman and the requirements of the responsible scientist. The Hunting Hypothesis is not so much a sequel to the three previous books as the culmination of them. He draws on twenty years of wide reading and deep thinking, of predictable objection and surprising corroboration, to produce a unique and beautiful account of the making of man.

The Hunting Hypothesis found success with popular audiences, though it sold fewer copies than African Genesis or The Territorial Imperative. In 2014 it was reissued in a new edition.

== Climate change ==
The Hunting Hypothesis was also one of the first books to warn about the possible dangers of climate change for the continued existence of humanity. In particular, Ardrey argued that the changing climate could render inoperable vast swathes of wheat-producing land in the Northern United States, Canada and Russia. He advocated long-term action and respect for nature. "One of Ardrey's major criticisms of modern man is precisely that since the inception of agriculture he has sought to dominate nature, separating himself from it until he is now coming to think of himself as nature's master."
