= Killer ape theory =

Evolutionary theory

The killer ape theory or killer ape hypothesis is the theory that war and interpersonal aggression was the driving force behind human evolution. It was originated by Raymond Dart in his 1953 article "The predatory transition from ape to man"; it was developed further in African Genesis by Robert Ardrey in 1961. The theory gained notoriety for suggesting that the urge to violence was a fundamental part of human psychology. It is associated with the hunting hypothesis, also developed by Ardrey.

According to the theory, the ancestors of humans were distinguished from other primate species by their greater aggressiveness, and this aggression is the source of humanity's murderous instincts.

However, subsequent research has shown that both chimpanzees and bonobos may exhibit aggressive behaviour over 100 times more often than humans.

== Overview ==
The theory has variations as to what kind of violence served as the evolutionary catalyst: one-on-one aggression or group-based aggression.

Several theories suggest the primary reason humans evolved bipedalism was to conserve energy while running, and to free the use of upper limbs. The killer ape theory posits that violence was a driving factor in evolving bipedalism, freeing the upper limbs to wield weapons.

In Creatures of Cain: The Hunt for Human Nature in Cold War America by Erika Lorraine Milam (2018), she states that, "in the 1970s, the theory unraveled altogether when primatologists discovered that chimpanzees also kill members of their own species". This still does not answer whether interpersonal violence derives from biological or social factors.

== Reception ==
Ethologist Konrad Lorenz showed interest in similar ideas in his book On Aggression (1963). In his introduction, he describes how rival butterfly fish defend their territories, leading him to raise the question of whether humans, too, tend to intraspecific conflict.

A 1984 article said Dart's evidence was slim, and was refuted by paleontologists in the early 1970s, in particular CK Brain and Elisabeth Vrba.

A 2008 article in Nature by Dan Jones stated, "A growing number of psychologists, neuroscientists, and anthropologists have accumulated evidence that understanding many aspects of antisocial behaviour, including violence and murder, requires the study of brains, genes, and evolution, as well as the societies those factors have wrought." Evolutionary psychologists generally argue that violence is not done for its own sake, but is a by-product of goals such as higher status or reproductive success. Some evolutionary psychologists argue that humans have specific mechanisms for specific forms of violence such as against stepchildren (the Cinderella effect). Chimpanzees have violence between groups, which are similar to raids and violence between human groups in nonstate societies, and produce similar death rates. On the other hand, intragroup violence is lower among humans living in small-group societies than among chimpanzees. Humans may have a strong tendency to differ between ingroup and outgroup, which affects altruistic and aggressive behaviour. Also, evidence exists that both intragroup and intergroup violence were much more prevalent in the recent past and in tribal societies. This suggests that tendencies to use violence to achieve goals are affected by social mores. Reduced inequalities, more available resources, and reduced blood feuds due to better-functioning justice systems may have contributed to declining intragroup violence.

The idea that man is naturally warlike has been challenged, for example in the book War, Peace, and Human Nature (2013), edited by Douglas P. Fry. The Seville Statement on Violence, released under UNESCO auspices in 1986, specifically rejects any genetic basis to violence or warfare though is considered outdated in light of more contemporary studies. More modern research and criticism has focused on misinterpretations of fossil evidence, lack of research into other apes, and the political climate of the Cold War.

== In fiction ==
The association of violence with a dramatic leap in human evolution can be seen in the opening sequence of 2001: A Space Odyssey.

The television show Sliders made extensive use of the killer ape theory in storyline arcs involving the Kromaggs.

== See also ==
- Congo (film)
- Gombe chimpanzee war
- Ngogo chimpanzee war
- Homo Necans (1972)
- On Aggression (1963)
- Returning soldier effect

== Bibliography ==
- Ardrey, Robert (1961). African Genesis: A Personal Investigation Into the Animal Origins and Nature of Man. New York: Atheneum Books. ISBN 978-0-00-211014-3. LCCN 61015889. OCLC 556678068.
- Dart, Raymond (1953). "The Predatory Transition from Ape to Man". International Anthropological and Linguistic Review. 1 (4): 201–217. ISSN 0534-6649.
- Haas, Jonathan; Piscitelli, Matthew (2013). "The Prehistory of Warfare: Misled by Ethnography". In Fry, Douglas P. (ed.). War, Peace, and Human Nature: The Convergence of Evolutionary and Cultural Views. New York: Oxford University Press. pp. 168–190. ISBN 978-0190232467.
- Jones, Dan (2008). "Human behaviour: Killer instincts". Nature. 451 (7178): 512–515. Bibcode:2008Natur.451..512J. doi:10.1038/451512a. PMID 18235473. S2CID 205035543.
- Lorenz, Konrad (1966). On Aggression. London: Methuen Publishing. ISBN 978-0-415-28320-5. LCCN 67072318. OCLC 72226348.
- Morris, Ian (2014). War! What Is It Good For?: The Role of Conflict and the Progress of Civilisation from Primates to Robots. Macmillan. ISBN 9781847654540.
- Hart, Donna, and Robert W. Sussman. Man the Hunted: Primates, Predators, and Human Evolution, Expanded Edition. ROUTLEDGE, 2019.
- Milam, Erika Lorraine (2020). Creatures of Cain: The Hunt for Human Nature in Cold War America. Princeton University Press. ISBN 978-0691181882.
- Kubrick, S. (n.d.). 2001: A space odyssey.
