= John Plamenatz =

Montenegrin philosopher (1912–1975)

- Born: Jovan Petrov Plamenac; May 16, 1912; Cetinje, Kingdom of Montenegro
- Died: February 19, 1975 (aged 62); Hook Norton, United Kingdom

Education
- Education: Oriel College, Oxford

Philosophical work
- Era: Contemporary philosophy
- Region: Western philosophy
- School: Continental philosophy
- Institutions: University of Oxford
- Main interests: Political philosophy

John Petrov Plamenatz (born as Jovan Petrov Plamenac; Serbian Cyrillic: Јован Петров Пламенац; 16 May 1912 – 19 February 1975) was a Montenegrin political philosopher, who spent most of his academic life at the University of Oxford. He is best known for his analysis of political obligation and his theory of democracy.

== Biography ==
Born to an upper-class family that had to flee Montenegro after the German and Austro-Hungarian occupation in 1916, Plamenatz came to England as a boy and was raised there. His father Peter was a politician active in the True People's Party and served for one term as a Foreign Minister for Montenegro, while his mother was of aristocratic background. Peter Plamenatz was forced to leave Montenegro in 1917, and John was sent to England.

He was educated at Clayesmore School, whose head master and founder, Alexander Devine, was an activist for the Montenegrin cause, and at Oriel College, Oxford, where he read history. Plamenatz's speciality was political theory, which he spent most of his academic life teaching at the University of Oxford. When World War II broke out, he joined an anti-aircraft battery, and he was naturalized in 1941. At the end of the war, he returned to All Souls, and he spent the rest of his life at Oxford. From 1951 to 1967 he was a research fellow at Nuffield College, before returning to All Souls as Chichele Professor. He was a Fellow of All Souls College, 1936–51, and from 1951 to 1967 a Fellow of Nuffield College. He returned to All Souls as a professorial Fellow in 1967 when he succeeded Isaiah Berlin as Chichele Professor of Social and Political Theory.

He was a member of the government in exile of the Kingdom of Yugoslavia in London during the Second World War. During this period he wrote "The Case of General Mihailovic".

In 1943 he married Marjorie Hunter, one of his students; there were no children. He lived at All Souls and at Scotland Mount, Hook Norton, Banbury, Oxfordshire. His principal recreation was walking.

== Works ==
- Consent, Freedom and Political Obligation (1938)
- What is Communism? (1947) with Stephen King-Hall
- The English Utilitarians, with a reprint of Mill's Utilitarianism (1949) and later editions
- The Revolutionary Movement in France 1815 to 1871 (1952)
- From Marx to Stalin (1953)
- German Marxism and Russian Communism (1954)
- On Alien Rule and Self-Government (1960)
- Man & Society. A Critical Examination of Some Important Social & Political Theories from Machiavelli to Marx (2 vols, 1963) and later editions
- Readings from Liberal Writers, English and French (1965) editor
- Leviathan, edited & abridged by John Plamenatz. Thomas Hobbes (Author). Publisher: London: Fontana (1969)
- Ideology (1970)
- Democracy and Illusion: An Examination of Certain Aspects of Modern Democratic Theory (1973)
- Karl Marx's Philosophy of Man (1975)
- Machiavelli, Hobbes, and Rousseau (2012)

== Notes ==
Academic offices
Preceded by Sir Isaiah Berlin	Chichele Professor of Social and Political Theory; 1967–1975	Succeeded by Charles Taylor
