= Raymond Dart =

Australian anatomist and anthropologist (1893–1988)

Raymond Arthur Dart
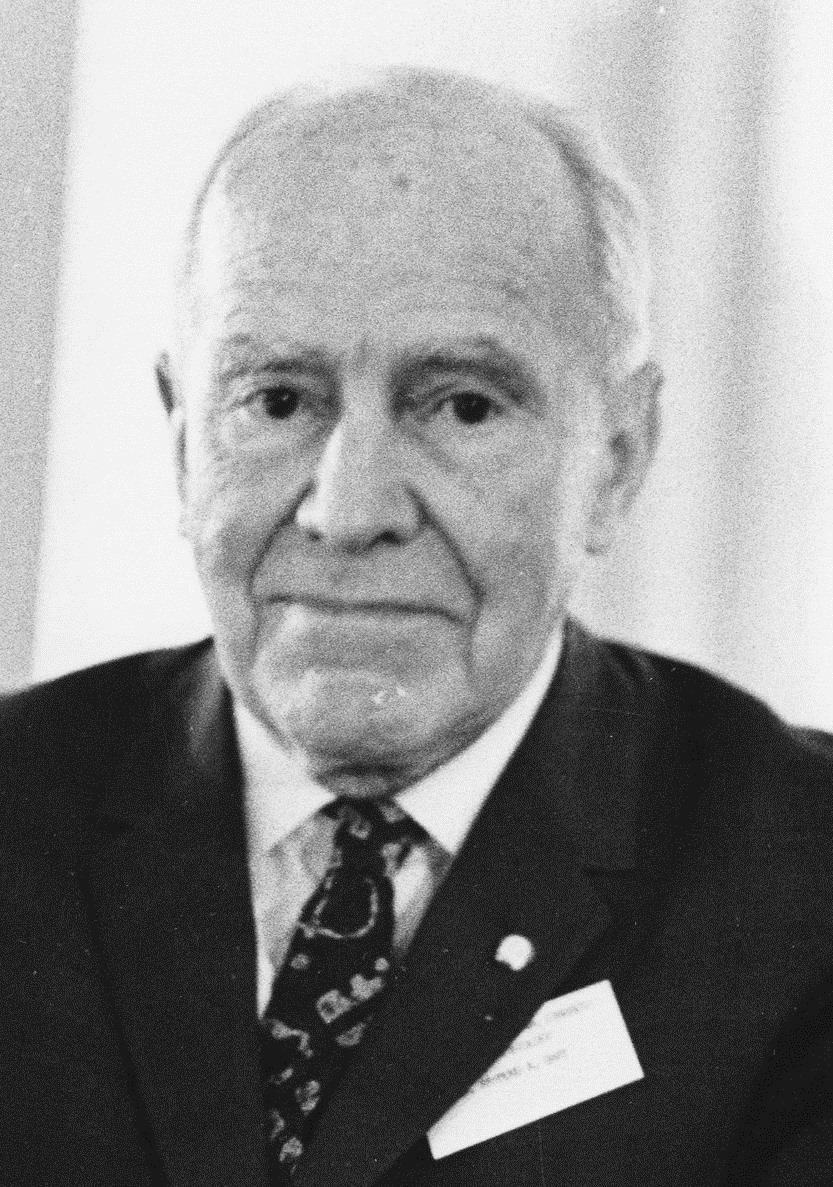
- Dart in 1968
- Born: 4 February 1893; Brisbane, Queensland
- Died: 22 November 1988 (aged 95); Johannesburg, South Africa
- Education: Ipswich Grammar School, University of Queensland, University of Sydney
- Known for: Australopithecus africanus, Taung Child
- Spouses: Dora Tyree (m. 1921; div. 1934) Marjorie Frew (m. 1936)
- Awards: Viking Fund Medal (1957)
- Scientific career
- Fields: Anatomist, anthropologist

Raymond Arthur Dart (4 February 1893 – 22 November 1988) was an Australian anatomist and anthropologist, best known for his involvement in the 1924 discovery of the first fossil found of Australopithecus africanus, an extinct hominin closely related to humans, at Taung in the North of South Africa in the Northwest province. He also did extensive work on physical anthropology in the tradition of scientific racism.

== Early life ==
Raymond Dart was born in Toowong, a suburb of Brisbane, Queensland, Australia, the fifth of nine children and son of a farmer and tradesman. His birth occurred during the 1893 flood, which filled his parents' home and shop in Toowong. The family moved alternately between their country property near Laidley and their shop in Toowong. The young Dart attended Toowong State School, Blenheim State School and earned a scholarship to Ipswich Grammar School from 1906 to 1909. Dart considered becoming a medical missionary to China and wished to study medicine at the University of Sydney, but his father argued that he should accept the scholarship he won to the newly established University of Queensland and study science. He was a member of the first intake of students to the university in 1911 and studied geology under H.C. Richards and zoology, taking his BSc in 1913. Dart became the first student to graduate with honours from the University of Queensland in 1914 and took his MSc with honours from UQ in 1916. He studied medicine at the University of Sydney taking his MB and M.Surgery in 1917, and conducting his residency at St Andrews College, University of Sydney. He was awarded his M.D. from the University of Sydney in 1927.

Dart served as a captain and medic in the Australian Army in England and France during the last year of World War I.

Following the war, he took up a position as a senior demonstrator at the University College, London in 1920 at the behest of Grafton Elliot Smith, famed anatomist, anthropologist and fellow Australian. This was followed by a year on a Rockefeller Foundation Fellowship at Washington University in St. Louis. Returning to England and work at the University College, London, he reluctantly took up the position of Professor at the newly established department of anatomy at the University of the Witwatersrand in Johannesburg, South Africa in 1922, after encouragement from Elliot Smith and Sir Arthur Keith.

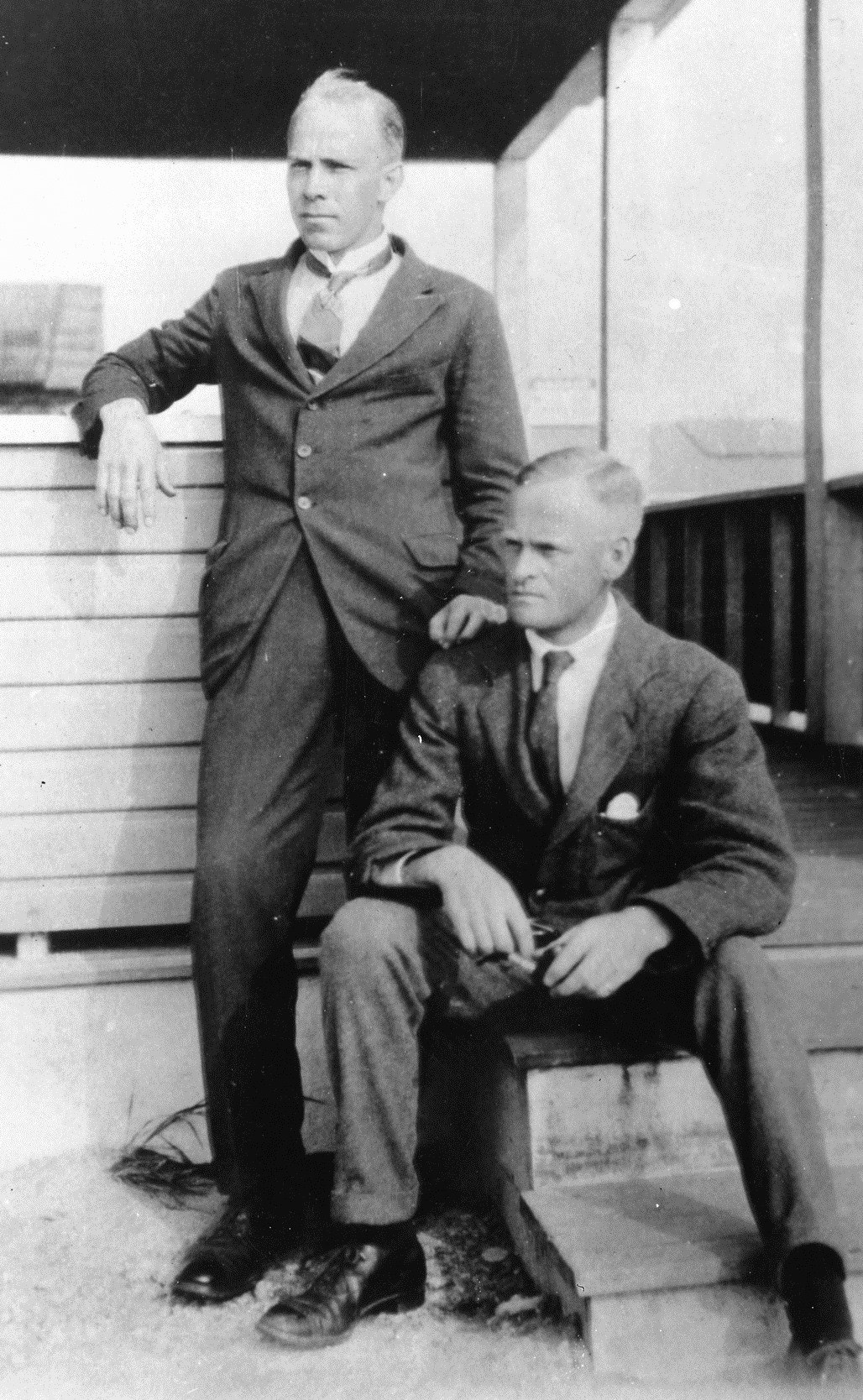
Dart (left) and Joseph L. Shellshear, c. 1921

== Career ==
=== Paleoanthropology and the discovery of Australopithecus ===
Dart is commonly credited with discovering the first Australopithecus africanus fossil in 1924, an extinct hominin closely related to humans. In reality, there have been diverging narratives about the discovery of the fossilised skull, and Dart's memoir states clearly that he did not actually discover it. His colleague, Professor Robert Burns Young from the Buxton Limeworks, had sent Dart two crates of fossils from the small town of Taung in the North West Province of South Africa. Upon seeing the fossils, Dart immediately recognised one as being an early human because its brain dimensions were too large for a baboon or chimpanzee. Blasting had exposed a breccia-filled cave and the child's skull had come to light together with several fossilised monkeys and hyraxes. M. de Bruyn had noticed their unusual nature in November 1924 and informed the Limeworks manager, Mr. A.E. Spiers.

Later, in his 1959 memoirs, Dart acknowledged the crucial role played by his first female student and demonstrator, Josephine Salmons, in identifying the importance of the fossil which was to become known as the Taung Child. She brought to his attention the existence of a fossilised baboon skull at the house of Edwin Gilbert Izod, director of the Northern Lime Company and proprietor of a quarry in Taung. The skull was kept as an ornament on the mantlepiece above the fireplace at his home. In bringing the skull to show Dart, she set in motion a chain of events that led to the discovery of the "child skull of Taung".

In 1925, Dart published an article in Nature in which he presented the species as Australopithecus africanus, the "southern ape from Africa", and claimed that the fossil was an indication that early hominins had lived in Africa. As Dart was not part of the scientific establishment, and because the fossil was found in Africa, and not Europe or Asia, where the establishment supposed man's origins, his findings were initially dismissed.

Dart's closest ally was Robert Broom whose discoveries of further Australopithecines (as well as Wilfrid Le Gros Clark's support) eventually vindicated Dart, so much so that in 1947 Sir Arthur Keith said "...Dart was right, and I was wrong". Keith made this statement referring to his dismissal and scepticism of Dart's analysis of the Taung Child as an early human ancestor; Keith thought that it was more likely to be an ape, yet later research by Broom confirmed Dart's theories. Dart's theories were also popularised by playwright, screenwriter, and science writer Robert Ardrey, first in an article published in The Reporter and reprinted in Science Digest, and later in Ardrey's influential four-book Nature of Man Series, which began in 1961 with African Genesis.

Not all of Dart's theories would in the end be vindicated. A number of his theories, including that of the killer ape, have been refuted. However, some of his ideas retain support. His work was clearly influenced by the mentors he worked with in his early career, in particular Grafton Elliot Smith.

=== Neuroanatomy, physical anthropology and race typology ===
Dart was director of the School of Anatomy at the University of the Witwatersrand, Johannesburg until 1958. There he worked with Phillip Tobias, who continued his work in the study of the Cradle of Humankind and other paleoanthropological sites.

Although Dart's name is mostly associated with the discovery of Australopithecus, he spent large parts of his career working on comparative anatomy, physical anthropology and racial typology. Like many scientists of the time, he believed in classifying humans according to their physical characteristics as a means to understand human evolution and justify the hierarchy of race. He had a particular interest in the anatomy of the South African San and Khoekhoe people, and in 1936 he led a major expedition by Wits scientists to the Kalahari, where he gathered San individuals to take their measurements and photographs, recording the characteristics of their face, hair, and other body parts including the genitals. He also collected some 70 face masks, by moulding plaster of Paris onto the faces of living people, following a practice developed by Lidio Cipriani (who believed in the racial superiority of Italians over Africans, and was later to work in the Italian race office). Based on these data as well as anthropometric data earlier collected by others, in 1937 he published two articles in the journal Bantu Studies. Like others, he described San people by the offensive and dehumanising term of "living fossils, representative of the primitive state of all mankind, mementos of our primaeval past”.

Dart proposed the idea of dual evolutionary origins of the neocortex. During his research in the 1930s in Africa, he studied the architecture of reptilian brains. He was able to identify a primordial neocortex, the oldest structure that can be considered as a neocortex, in a reptile. He identified a distinction between the cytoarchitecture in an area that split it into a para-hippocampal and a para-pyriform region.

== Personal life ==
Dart married Dora Tyree, a medical student from Virginia, U.S., in 1921 in Woods Hole, Massachusetts, U.S., and they divorced in 1934. He married Marjorie Frew, head librarian at the University of Witwatersrand in Johannesburg, South Africa in 1936 and they had two children.

At the age of 73, Dart began dividing his time between South Africa and The Institutes for the Achievement of Human Potential (IAHP), an organisation founded by Glenn Doman that treats brain injured children. Dart's son, Galen, had suffered motor damage during birth in 1941. Dart spent much of the next twenty years working with the IAHP.

Dart died in Johannesburg in 1988.

== Legacy and critical engagement with Dart's work ==
The Institute for the Study of Man in Africa was established in 1956 at Witwatersrand in his honour by Phillip Tobias. In 1964 the Raymond Dart Memorial Lecture was inaugurated at the Institute.

In 1959, an autobiographical account of Dart's discoveries, Adventures with the Missing Link, was published (with Dennis Craig as co-author).

It is only in the 1990s that critical voices about Dart's legacy started making themselves heard, especially as far as his contribution to scientific racism is concerned. In a study of the history of scientific racism in South Africa, Saul Dubow critiqued the objectification of human beings practiced by Dart and others in the field of physical anthropology. Around the same period, Catherine Burns critiqued the focus of scientists, medical scholars and anthropologists, including Dart, on measuring black women’s physical and sexual characteristics as a means of defining racial types. Yvette Abrahams also made reference to Dart in her 1997 discussion of the century-long obsession of Europeans with the sexual characteristics of the Khoi and the San.

Later critiques include those by Rassool and Hayes (2002), who shed light on the link between his science and spectacle, and raised the question of the ethics around the storage of skeletons and human remains; Derricourt (2009), who questioned his theories of cultural diffusion, and Morris (2012), who contends that the race typology developed by Dart and Tobias provided a solid justification for apartheid policies. Kuljan (2016), in researching for her book Darwin's hunch, found archival evidence that Professor Dart has actually been consulted in court at least twice to help ascertain a person's racial classification, at one occasion leading to a person being charged with illegal possession of alcohol.

== Works ==
- Dart R.A. (1925): Australopithecus africanus: The Man-Ape of South Africa. Nature, Vol.115, No.2884 (1925) 195-9 (the original paper communicating the Taung finding, in PDF format).
- Dart, R.A. (1939): Population Fluctuation over 7000 years in Egypt
- Dart, R.A. (1953): "The Predatory Transition from Ape to Man." International Anthropological and Linguistic Review, 1, pp. 201–217.The publication does not exist on line, but in "http://www.users.miamioh.edu/erlichrd/vms_site/dart.html" there is a copy of the article.
- Dart, Raymond A. and Craig, Dennis (1959): Adventures with the Missing Link. New York: Harper & Brothers (autobiography).
- Fagan, Brian. The Passion of Raymond Dart. Archaeology v. 42 (May–June 1989): p. 18.
- Johanson, Donald & Maitland Edey. Lucy: The Beginnings of Humankind. New York: Simon & Schuster, 1990 ISBN 0-671-25036-1
- Murray, Alexander ed. (1996): Skill and Poise: Articles on skill, poise and the F. M. Alexander Technique. Collection of Raymond Dart's papers. Hardcover, 192+xiv pages, b/w illustrations, 234 x 156 mm, index, UK, STAT Books.

== See also ==
- Dawn of Humanity
- Hominidae
- Human evolution
- List of fossil sites
- List of hominina fossils
- Prehistoric warfare
- W. Maxwell Cowan, his student
