= Robert Wokler =

British intellectual historian (1942–2006)

- Born: 6 December 1942; Auch, France
- Died: 30 July 2006 (aged 63); Cambridge, England, United Kingdom
- Occupation: Historian
- Parent(s): Isaac Wochiler; Ilona

Academic background
- Education: University of Chicago (BA); London School of Economics (MA); University of Oxford (PhD)
- Thesis: The social thought of Jean-Jacques Rousseau : an historical interpretation of his early writings (1968)
- Academic advisors: Isaiah Berlin; John Plamenatz
- Influences: Ralph Leigh; Leo Strauss

Academic work
- Discipline: Historian; Philosopher; Political scientist
- Sub-discipline: Age of Enlightenment; Jean-Jacques Rousseau
- Institutions: Magdalen College, Oxford 1967-1971 (Junior Lecturer in Modern History University of Reading, 1968-1971 (Junior Research Fellow in Politics and French Studies) University of Manchester, 1971-1983 (Lecturer in Government); 1983-1994 (Senior Lecturer in Government) (seconded to Department of History, 1992-1994); 1994-1998 (Reader in the History of Political Thought) Sidney Sussex College, Cambridge, 1973-1975 (David Thomson Senior Research Fellow) Trinity College, Cambridge, 1978-1979 (Visiting Fellow Commoner) University of California at Los Angeles, Summer 1981 (Postdoctoral Fellow) Elected member of Johnson Club, 1985 Fellow of Royal Historical Society, 1990 Professorial Visiting Fellow at the John Olin Center for the History of Political Culture, University of Chicago, 1990 British Academy/Leverhulme Senior Research Fellow, 1993-1994 Visiting Research Fellow, School of Social Sciences, Australian National University, 1994 Institute for Advanced Study, Princeton, 1994-1995, Member of School of Social Science Fellow of Swedish Collegium for Advanced Study in the Social Sciences, Uppsala, 1995-1996 Leverhulme Research Fellow, 1996-1997 Fellow of Collegium Budapest, 1997-1998 Senior Research Fellow, University of Exeter, 1999-2003 Visiting Professor, Department of History, Central European University, Budapest, 1999 Jean Monnet Fellow, Department of History and Civilization, European University Institute, Florence, 2001-2002 Visiting Senior Lecturer in the Special Program in the Humanities and in the Department of Political Science, Yale University, 2002-2004 Senior Lecturer in the Special Program in the Humanities and in the Department of Political Science, Yale University, 2004-Robert Wokler's death

Robert Lucien Wokler (6 December 1942 – 30 July 2006) was an Anglo-French historian who was a leading scholar of the political thought of Jean-Jacques Rousseau and the Enlightenment.

== Biography ==
He was born in Auch, France, to Isaac and Ilona Wochiler, both war refugees; the parents were allowed entry to Switzerland several months later because they were accompanying an infant child. Many members of the family were victims of the Holocaust. He was born into a generation deeply affected by the political and intellectual upheavals of the twentieth century, and these experiences shaped his later interest in the questions of toleration, persecution and political violence. The Guardian writes: "He saw in the Enlightenment a profound response to experiences of religiously-inspired violence all too similar to the events of his own time; he believed that the Enlightenment's calls for toleration and personal freedom, and its opposition to sectarianism and fanaticism, remained urgently needed."

Robert Wokler and his family settled in Paris and later in San Francisco during his childhood. He entered the University of Chicago on a music scholarship but found an interest in political thought after meeting political philosopher Leo Strauss. He received his bachelor's degree from the University of Chicago in 1964, followed by his master's from the London School of Economics in 1966. He then completed a DPhil from Nuffield College, Oxford, in 1968. At Oxford, John Plamenatz and Isaiah Berlin, both refugees themselves, served as his supervisors, whose approaches to the history of ideas had a lasting influence on him. His doctoral thesis examined the social and political thought of Jean-Jacques Rousseau, a topic that would be a focus for much of his career.

Wokler's doctoral research provided the foundation for his later interpretation of Rousseau. Rather than treating Rousseau’s ideas as a series of isolated arguments, Wokler sought to reconstruct the historical and intellectual circumstances in which they developed. He was particularly interested in the period following the publication of Rousseau’s Discourse on the Sciences and Arts in 1751. In Wokler’s view, the public controversy that followed the work was especially important because Rousseau used his responses to critics to clarify and develop his ideas. He therefore placed particular emphasis on four works that emerged from this period: the Second Discourse (‘On the Origins of Inequality among Men’), the unpublished Essay on the Origins of Languages, the Letter on French Music and the early version of The Social Contract. Wokler argued that in these texts Rousseau reflected on contemporary literature, including those of the naturalist Buffon, the Encyclopédiste Diderot and the composer Rameau. The violinist-turned-historian was exceptionally well placed to investigate Rousseau’s extensive work on music. Through detailed examination of manuscripts and other historical evidence, Wokler demonstrated how closely Rousseau’s ideas about human nature, language, music and politics were connected.

Wokler's interests extended beyond Rousseau's political philosophy into the wider intellectual debates of the Enlightenment. For example he extended his study of the Rousseau-Rameau debate to investigate the Querelle des Bouffons, the eighteenth-century controversy over French and Italian opera. He was also fascinated by Enlightenment's discussions of human origins and the relationship between humans and other animals. He particularly explored Rousseau's reflections on oragn-utans and the possibility that early humans might have been closely related to them. This interest later led Wokler to examine similar questions in the Scottish Enlightenment, especially the work of James Burnett, Lord Monboddo. Although Wokler wrote about other major works such as Julie, Emile and The Social Contract, he repeatedly returned to Rousseau's writings of the mid-1750s, particularly the Second Discourse and the Essay on the Origins of Languages.

Beginning in 1971, he taught in the Government Department at the University of Manchester, which remained his academic base for more than twenty-five years. He became a reader in 1994. During this period, however, he also spent significant amounts of time at other institutions. He held fellowships at Sidney Sussex and Trinity colleges at the University of Cambridge, and during this time at Trinity he was close to Ralph Leigh, who was preparing his major edition of Rousseau's correspondence. Wokler assisted Leigh with this project and later contributed to some of its final volumes after Leigh's death in 1987. He also helped establish the Leigh collection at Cambridge University Library, which was built around eight thousand volumes from Leigh's personal library and became an important collection of eighteenth-century material relating to Rousseau.

Wokler's academic career became increasingly international during the 1990s. Before taking early retirement from Manchester in 1998, he held visiting positions at institutes for advanced research in Canberra, Princeton, Uppsala and Budapest. Following his retirement, he continued to work at a number of leading institutions, including the University of Exeter, the Central European University in Budapest, the European University Institute in Florence and Yale University, where he held a senior lectureship. His wide-ranging academic activity reflected his international reputation and his connections with scholars working across the fields of political thought, intellectual history and Enlightenment studies.

Like his teacher Isaiah Berlin Wokler believed that the history of ideas required both rigorous scholarship and an appreciation of the human drama surrounding political and intellectual change. Berlin was an important influence on his approach, although Wokler did not simply reproduce his teacher's interpretation of Rousseau. Instead, he developed his own distinctive account based on close historical research and attention to the relationship between thinkers, texts and wider intellectual controversies. Wokler, like Berlin, also tended to publish his ideas through essays rather than large systematic books. His articles appeared across a wide range of academic journals and collections, sometimes originating as lectures delivered at international conferences. This gave his writing an engaging quality but also meant that certain arguments and examples appeared repeatedly across his work.

The Enlightenment itself was another major concern for Wokler. He rejected interpretations that presented eighteenth-century thought as a straightforward intellectual precursor to the violence and totalitarianism of the twentieth century. Instead, he argued that the Enlightenment had to be understood in the context of its opposition to religious persecution and intolerance. He saw its commitment to toleration, personal freedom and resistance to sectarianism and fanaticism as responses to experiences of religiously motivated violence. These values, he believed, remained important in the modern world. His position was also shaped by contemporary events, particularly the ethnic cleansing in Bosnia, which deeply disturbed him. He wanted to write about his mother's experiences during the Second World War as a way of confronting political indifference to human suffering. He was also interested in the intellectual careers of refugees who had fled fascism and communism, including Isaiah Berlin and Ernst Cassirer.

Despite his extensive scholarship, Wokler left several ambitious projects unfinished. Among the books he hoped to write were Rousseau's Enlightenment, which would have explored the intellectual contexts of Rousseau's work; The Enlightenment Roots of Anthropology; and The Transfiguration of the Body Politic, a study of the state power as a ghostly representation of the people. He also planned a work examining the Enlightenment and its critics, in which he would have defended the diversity and vitality of eighteenth-century thought against interpretations influenced by thinkers such as Theodor Adorno and Max Horkheimer. The fact that many of these projects remained incomplete reflected not a lack of ideas but the extraordinary range of his scholarly interests and his willingness to devote time to collaborative and editorial projects.

Wokler was deeply involved in the work of other scholars as well. He assisted Maurice Cranston with his multi-volume biography of Rousseau and worked on Ralph Leigh's edition of Rousseau's correspondence. He also re-edited John Plamenatz's Man and Society and, with John Hope Mason, published a selection of Diderot's political writings. One of his major editorial achievements was the Cambridge History of Eighteenth-Century Political Thought, which was completed shortly before his death and published posthumously. A number of materials from his collection relating to Rousseau and Diderot are now held by the University of Cambridge, further reflecting his lasting contribution to the preservation and study of eighteenth-century intellectual history.

Wokler's own single-authored publications were relatively few compared with the enormous quantity of his essays and collaborative work. His doctoral thesis was eventually published in 1987 as Rousseau on Society, Politics, Music and Language. His other major book was Rousseau, first published after 1995 for the Oxford Past Masters series and later reissued in 2001 as Rousseau: A Very Short Introduction. Despite its brevity, this book has been regarded as an especially effective introduction to Rousseau's ideas, demonstrating Wokler's ability to combine detailed scholarship with an accessible style.

After becoming seriously ill, Wokler reduced his publishing ambitions and concentrated on preparing collections of his previously published essays. The selection of his papers that appeared after his death originated in a volume he had begun planning while at Yale. Although the final collection could not reproduce his original plan exactly, it brought together many of his most characteristic writings. Some repetition remained, reflecting the fact that Wokler frequently returned to particular passages and ideas in Rousseau that he found especially revealing.

Wokler died of cancer in Cambridge on 30 July 2006, aged sixty-three. His career was marked by a combination of detailed historical scholarship, wide-ranging intellectual curiosity and a strong concern with the political meaning of Enlightenment ideas. Although Rousseau remained at the centre of his work, his scholarship extended to music, anthropology, the history of political thought and the defence of religious and political toleration. His legacy therefore lies not only in his interpretation of Rousseau but also his broader effort to understand the Enlightenment as a diverse intellectual movement whose commitments to freedom, toleration and opposition to fanaticism continued to have significance in the modern world.

Wokler's works include Man and society: political and social theories from Machiavelli to Marx (1992), Rousseau: a very short introduction (1995), Rousseau and Liberty (1998), The Enlightenment: the nation-state and the primal patricide of modernity (1998), and Rousseau, the Age of Enlightenment, and Their Legacies (2012), a collection of essays.

== Publications ==
=== Books and monographs ===
- Rousseau, the Age of Enlightenment, and Their Legacies, Bryan Garsten (ed.), intro. by Christopher Brooke, Princeton: Princeton University Press (2012).
- Rousseau on Society, Politics, Music and Language: An Historical Interpretation of his Early Writings, New York: Garland (1987).
- Rousseau, in the ‘Past Master’ series, Oxford: Oxford University Press, 1995, reissued 1996; revised, expanded and illustrated edition for the ‘Very Short Introduction’ series, 2001; German translation by Michaela Rehm, Freiburg: Herder, 1999; Japanese translation by Shuji Yamamoto, Osaka: Koyo Shobo, 2000; Italian translation by Simona Ferlini, Bologna: Il Mulino, 2001; Korean translation by J. I. Lee, Seoul: Sigongsa, 2001; Turkish translation by Cemal Atila, Istanbul: Altin Kitaplar, 2003; Greek translation by P. N. Pantazakos, Athens: Ellinika Grammata (distributed with To Vima), 2006; Albanian translation by J. Qineti, Tirana: Ideart, 2008; French translation by Samuel Baudry and Daniel Reynaul, Lyon: Presses Universitaire de Lyon, 2011; Romanian translation by A. State, Bucharest: Editor ALL, 2011; Portuguese translation by D. Bottmann, Porto Alegre: L&P Editores, 2012; Arabic translation by A. M. Al Roby, Cairo: Itindavi Foundation for Education and Culture, 2015; Spanish translation by S. Martin, Madrid: Grupo Anaya, 2017; Chinese translation by J. Lui, Nanjing: Yilin Press, 2020 (English version also included).
- ‘Rameau, Rousseau and the Essai sur l’origine des langues’, Studies on Voltaire and the Eighteenth Century CXVII (1974) pp. 179–238 (listed by Wokler as a monograph).
- ‘The influence of Diderot on the political theory of Rousseau’, Studies on Voltaire and the Eighteenth Century CXXXII (1975) pp. 55–111 (listed by Wokler as a monograph).

=== Scholarly editions ===
- Correspondance complète de Jean-Jacques Rousseau, édition critique établie par R.A. Leigh, revue par Robert Wokler (avec Janet Laming), tome XLVII, Oxford: The Voltaire Foundation (1988).
- Correspondance complète de Jean-Jacques Rousseau, R.A. Leigh (ed.), revue par Robert Wokler (avec Janet Laming), tome XLVIII, Oxford: The Voltaire Foundation (1988).
- Correspondance complète de Jean-Jacques Rousseau, R.A. Leigh (ed.), revue par Robert Wokler (avec Janet Laming), tome XLIX, including ‘avertissement’, Oxford: The Voltaire Foundation (1989).
- Diderot's Political Writings with J.H. Mason (trans. and ed.), Cambridge: Cambridge University Press (1992).
- Man and Society, by John Plamenatz, 3 vols., a new edition, expanded and revised by M.E. Plamenatz and R. Wokler, vol. I: From the Middle Ages to Locke, London: Longmans (1992) reprinted 1993, 1996.
- Man and Society, by John Plamenatz, a new edition, expanded and revised by M. E. Plamenatz and R. Wokler, vol. II: From Montesquieu to the Early Socialists, London: Longmans (1992) reprinted 1993.
- Man and Society, by John Plamenatz, a new edition, expanded and revised by M.E. Plamenatz and R. Wokler, vol. III: Hegel, Marx and Engels, and the Idea of Progress, London: Longmans (1992) reprinted 1993, 1996.

=== Edited collections ===
- Rousseau and the Eighteenth Century. Essays in memory of R.A. Leigh, M. Hobson, J. Leigh and R. Wokler (eds.) Oxford: The Voltaire Foundation (1992).
- Inventing Human Science with C. Fox and R. Porter (eds.) Berkeley: University of California Press (1995).
- Rousseau and Liberty, R. Wokler (ed.) Manchester: Manchester University Press (1995).
- The Enlightenment and Modernity with N. Geras (eds.) Houndmills, Basingstoke: Macmillan (2000).
- Isaiah Berlin's Counter-Enlightenment with J. Mali (eds.) (including Wokler's own chapter on ‘Isaiah Berlin's Enlightenment and Counter-Enlightenment’), Transactions of the American Philosophical Society, vol. 93, part. 5, March 2004.
- The Cambridge History of Eighteenth-Century Political Thought, with M. Goldie (eds.) (including Wokler's own chapter on ‘Ideology and the Origins of Social Science’) Cambridge: Cambridge University Press (2006).

=== Contributions to books ===
- ‘Rousseau's Perfectibilian Libertarianism’, in A. Ryan (ed.) The Idea of Freedom: Essays in Honour of Isaiah Berlin, Oxford: Oxford University Press (1979):233-252.
- ‘Rousseau on Rameau and Revolution’, in R.F. Brissenden and J.C. Eade (eds.) Studies in the Eighteenth Century, Canberra: Australian National University Press (1979):251-283.
- ‘The Discours sur les sciences et les arts and its offspring: Rousseau in Reply to his Critics’, in S. Harvey, M. Hobson, et al (eds.) Reappraisals of Rousseau, Studies in honour of R A Leigh, Manchester: Manchester University Press (1980):250-278.
- ‘L’Essai sur l’origine des langues en tant que fragment du Discours sur l’inégalité: Rousseau et ses ‘mauvais’ interprètes’, in M. Launay (ed.) Rousseau et Voltaire en 1978, (Actes du Colloque international de Nice, juin 1978) Geneva: Slatkine (1981):145-169.
- ‘From the Orang-utan to the Vampire: Towards an Anthropology of Rousseau’ (with C. Frayling)’, in R.A. Leigh (ed.) Rousseau after Two Hundred Years: Proceedings of the Cambridge Bicentennial Colloquium, Cambridge: Cambridge University Press (1982):109-129.
- ‘Rousseau and Marx’, in D. Miller and L. Siedentop (eds.) The Nature of Political Theory: Essays in Honour of John Plamenatz, Oxford: Oxford University Press (1983):219-246.
- ‘Rousseau’, in Political Thought from Plato to Nato, London: Ariel Books/British Broadcasting Corporation (1984):120-134.
- ‘Rousseau's Two Concepts of Liberty’, in G. Feaver and F. Rosen (eds.) Lives, Liberties and the Public Good, Houndmills, Basingstoke: Macmillan (1987):61-100.
- ‘Saint-Simon and the Passage from Political to Social Science’, in Anthony Pagden (ed.) The Languages of Political Theory in Early Modern Europe, Cambridge: Cambridge University Press (1987):325-338.
- ‘Our Illusory Chains; Rousseau's Images of Bondage and Freedom’, in M. Cranston and L.C. Boralevi (eds.) Culture et politique, Berlin: Walter de Gruyter (1988):41-50.
- ‘Natural Law and the Meaning of Rousseau's Political Thought’, in G. Barber, C. Courtney and D. Gilson (eds.) Enlightenment Essays in Memory of Robert Shackleton, Oxford: The Voltaire Foundation (1988):319-335.
- ‘Apes to Races in the Scottish Enlightenment: Kames and Monboddo on the History of Man’, in P. Jones (ed.) Science and Philosophy in the Scottish Enlightenment, Edinburgh: John Donald (1989):145-168.
- ‘Avertissement du Quarante-neuvième Volume’, in Correspondance complète du Jean Jacques Rousseau, vol. XLIX, Oxford: Voltaire Foundation (1989):xxiii-xxvi.
- ‘Preparing the definitive edition of the Correspondance de Rousseau’, in Rousseau and the Eighteenth Century, Oxford: Voltaire Foundation at the Taylor Institution (1992):3-21.
- ‘Taking stock of the Leigh edition of the Correspondance de Rousseau’, Proceedings of the 1991 Bristol Congress of the Enlightenment, Studies on Voltaire and the Eighteenth Century, Oxford: The Voltaire Foundation (1992):1807-1811.
- ‘Hegel's Rousseau: the General Will and Civil Society’, Deutscher Idealismus, (papers presented at a Symposium on German Idealism in November 1991) Göteborg: Arachne (1993):7-45.
- ‘Democracy's Mythical Ordeals: The Promethean and Procrustean Paths to Popular Self-rule’, in M. Moran and G. Parry (eds.) Democracy and Democratization, Oxford: Routledge (1994):21-46.
- ‘Projecting the Enlightenment’, in J. Horton and S. Mendus (eds.) After MacIntyre, Cambridge: Polity Press (1994):108-126.
- ‘The Nexus of Animal and Rational: Sociobiology, Language and the Enlightenment Study of Apes’, in S. Maasen, E. Mendelsohn and P. Weingart (eds.) Biology as Society, Society as Biology: Metaphors, Sociology of the Sciences, A Yearbook, Vol. XVIII (1994):81-103.
- ‘Enlightening Apes: Eighteenth-Century Speculation and Current Experiments on Linguistic Competence’, in R. Corbey and B. Theunissen (eds.), Ape, Man, Apeman Changing Views since 1600, Proceedings of the 1993 Leiden Pithecanthropus Centennial, Leiden (1995):87-100.
- ‘Anthropology and conjectural history in the Enlightenment’, in Inventing Human Science, (1995):31-52.
- ‘The Enlightenment Science of Politics’, in Inventing Human Science, (1995):323-345.
- ‘Rousseau and his critics on the fanciful liberties we have lost’, in Rousseau and Liberty, (1995):189-212.
- ‘Regressing towards post-modernity’, in Rousseau and Criticism, (Proceedings of North American Rousseau Society Colloquium of 1993), Trent University, Ontario, Ottawa: Pensée Libre (1995) 5:263-272.
- ‘Deconstructing the Self on the Wild Side’, in T. O’Hagan (ed.) Jean-Jacques Rousseau and the Sources of the Self, London (Avebury) (1997):106-119.
- ‘Dr Besterman, I presume’, in U. Kölving and C.Merveaud (eds.) Voltaire et ses combats, Vol. 1. Oxford (The Voltaire Foundation) (1997):21-36.
- ‘The Enlightenment and the French Revolutionary Birth Pangs of Modernity’, in L. Magnusson, B. Wittrock and J. Heilbron (eds.) The Rise of the Social Sciences and the Formation of Modernity: Conceptual Change in Context, 1750–1850, Sociology of the Sciences, A Yearbook, Vol. XX (1998) 35-76.
- ‘The Enlightenment, the nation-state and the primal patricide of modernity’, Discussion paper series no. 46 of the Collegium Budapest, 1999, adapted as Wokler's own contribution to The Enlightenment and Modernity, 161-183.
- ‘Multiculturalism and ethnic cleansing in the Enlightenment’, in O.P. Grell and R. Porter (eds.) Toleration in Enlightenment Europe, Cambridge: Cambridge University Press (2000):69-85.
- ‘The Enlightenment Project on the eve of the Holocaust’, in B. Sträth (ed.) Enlightenment and Genocide, Contradictions of Modernity, Brussels: Presses Universitaires Européennes (2000):161-183.
- ‘Ancient Postmodernism in the Philosophy of Rousseau’, in Rousseau and the Ancients (Proceedings of North American Rousseau Society Colloquium of 1994) Duke University, North Carolina, Ottawa: Pensée Libre, (2001) 8:4-27.
- ‘The professoriate of political thought in England since 1914: a tale of three chairs’, in D. Castiglione and I. Hampsher-Monk (eds.), The History of Political Thought in National Context, Cambridge: Cambridge University Press (2001):134-158.
- ‘Ancient Postmodernism in the Philosophy of Rousseau’, adapted from Wokler's contribution to Pensée libre, no. 8, in P. Riley (ed.) The Cambridge Companion to Rousseau, Cambridge: Cambridge University Press (2001):418-444.
- ‘Repatriating modernity's alleged debts to the Enlightenment: French Revolutionary social science and the genesis of the nation-state’, in P. Joyce (ed.) The Social in Question, London: Routledge (2002):62-80.
- ‘Political Modernity's Critical Juncture in the Course of the French Revolution’, in N. Witoszek and L. Trägårdh (eds.) Culture and Crisis: The Case of Germany and Sweden, New York and Oxford: Berghahn Books (2002):202-218.
- ‘Isaiah Berlin's Enlightenment and Counter-Enlightenment’, in J. Mali and R. Wokler (eds.) Isaiah Berlin's Counter-Enlightenment, Transactions of the American Philosophical Society, vol. 93, part. 5, March 2004, 13-31.
- ‘Ideology and the Origins of Social Science’, in M. Goldie and R. Wokler (eds.) The Cambridge History of Eighteenth-Century Political Thought, Cambridge: Cambridge University Press (2006):688-709.
- ‘All Ears’, in H. Hardy (ed.) The Book of Isaiah: Personal Impressions of Isaiah Berlin, Woodbridge: Boydell & Brewer (2009):169-172. (A commemorative lecture delivered at the Harvard Club in New York on 2 June 1998; It first appeared on the website of the Isaiah Berlin Library Trust in 2006.)
- ‘Rites of Passage and the Grand Tour: Discovering, Imagining and Inventing European Civilization in the Age of Enlightenment’, in A. Molho and D. R. Curto (eds.) Finding Europe: Discourses on Margins, Communities, Images, New York and Oxford: Berghahn Books (2007):205-222.

=== Journal articles ===
- ‘Tyson and Buffon on the orang-utan’, Studies on Voltaire (1976), CLV:2301-2319.
- ‘L’orango e l’uomo secondo Tyson e Buffon’, (expanded version and in part Wokler's own translation of ‘Tyson and Buffon’, as above) Ethos ( September 1977) V:249-265.
- ‘Perfectible apes in decadent cultures: Rousseau's anthropology revisited’, Daedalus (1978) (Summer), (special issue on Rousseau for our Time) 107-134.
- ‘The ape debates in Enlightenment anthropology’, Studies on Voltaire (1980) CXCII: 1164–1175.
- ‘A reply to Charvet: Rousseau and the perfectibility of man’, History of Political Thought (1980) I.i (Spring):81–90.
- ‘Rousseau e Marx’, (an amended and expanded translation, on which Wokler collaborated, of ‘Rousseau and Marx’, as above), Bollettino di Storia della filosofia (1987) March:83-112.
- ‘La Querelle des Bouffons and the Italian Liberation of France: a study of revolutionary foreplay’, published in a special issue (n.s. 11.i) of Eighteenth-Century Life (1987):93-116.
- ‘From l’homme physique to l’homme moral and back: towards a history of enlightenment anthropology’, History of Human Sciences, (1993) 6.i (February):121–138.
- ‘Rousseau's Pufendorf: natural law and the foundations of commercial society’, History of Political Thought ( Autumn 1994) XV:373–402.
- ‘Ralph Alexander Leigh’, obituary notice, Proceedings of the British Academy, (1994) 84:369–391.
- ‘Hegel versus Kant: from the Enlightenment project to post-modernity’, Australasian Studies in the History of Philosophy (1994) 2:85–99.
- ‘Situating Rousseau in his world and ours’, the Arthur Wilson Memorial Lecture presented at Dartmouth College, January 1995, Social Science Information (1995) 34.4:515–537.
- ‘Todorov's otherness’, New Literary History, (1996) 27.1:43–55.
- ‘The French Revolutionary roots of political modernity in Hegel's philosophy, or the Enlightenment at dusk’, Bulletin of the Hegel Society of Great Britain, (1997) 35:71–89.
- ‘The Enlightenment and the French Revolutionary birth pangs of modernity’, Sociology of the Sciences, (1997) 35:35–76.
- ‘Rousseau et la liberté’, Annales de la Société Jean-Jacques Rousseau (1997) XLII, 205-229. (Essay originally presented as the 1989 annual lecture to the Société Jean-Jacques Rousseau in Geneva.)
- ‘The Enlightenment project and its critics’, Poznan Studies (1998) 58 (issue entitled The Postmodernist critique of the project of Enlightenment):13–30.
- ‘Contextualizing Hegel's phenomenology of the French Revolution and the terror’, Political Theory, (1998) 26.1:33–55.
- ‘The subtextual reincarnation of Voltaire and Rousseau’, The American Scholar (1998) 67 (Spring):55–64.
- ‘Pistols for two and coffee for one: rekindling Voltaire's and Rousseau's quarrel in footnotes’, Studies on Voltaire, (1998) CCCLXII:1–10.
- ‘The Enlightenment project as betrayed by modernity’, History of European Ideas, (1998) 24.4–5:301.
- ‘The manuscript authority of political thoughts’, History of Political Thought, (1999) XX.1 (Essays presented to J.H. Burns):107–123.
- ‘Ernst Cassirer's Enlightenment: an exchange with Bruce Mazlish’, Studies in Eighteenth-Century Culture, (2000) 29:335–348.
- ‘From the moral and political sciences to the sciences of society by way of the French Revolution’, Jahrbuch für Recht und Ethik, (2000) 8:33–45.
- ‘Der besondere Charakter der ländlichen Aufklärung des Nordens’, The Cultural Construction of Norden, review essay of Bo Stråth et al (eds.), in Bernd Henningsen, ed. Wahlverwandtschaft, 9, Das Projekt Norden: Essays zur Konstruktion einer europäischen Region (2002):58-64.
- ‘Isaiah Berlin's Enlightenment and Counter-Enlightenment’, Jewish Studies Yearbook, Central European University, (2002) 2:205-219.
- ‘Rousseau's reading of the book of genesis and the theology of commercial society’, Modern Intellectual History, (2006) 3:85–94.
- ‘A guide to Isiah Berlin's Political Ideas in the Romantic Age’, (with an introduction by J. L. Cherniss and R. P. Hanley), History of Political Thought, (2008) 29.2:349-369.

=== Contributions to encyclopedias and dictionaries ===
- ‘Perfectibility of Man’, in W. F. Bynum and R. Porter (eds.) Dictionary of the History of Science, London: Macmillan (1981):316-317.
- ‘Introduction' and 'The Enlightenment’, in M.A. Riff (ed.) Dictionary of Political Ideologies, Manchester: Manchester University Press (1987):xi-xiv, 74-86.
- ‘Sixteen contributions (‘America’, ‘Civilization’, ‘Democracy’, ‘Liberalism’, ‘Liberty’, ‘Negroes’, ‘Optimism’, ‘Patriotism’, ‘The people’, ‘Physiocracy’, ‘Politeness’, ‘Primitivism’, ‘Progress’, ‘Property’, ‘Rights’, ‘Savagery’)’, in R. Porter and J. Yolton (eds.) The Blackwell Companion to the Enlightenment, Oxford: Blackwell (1990).
- ‘Race’ and ‘Savagery’, in J. Black and R. Porter (eds.) A Dictionary of Eighteenth-Century World History, Oxford: Blackwell (1994).
- ‘Diderot’, in Philosophy of Education: An Encyclopedia, New York: Garland (1996):155-158.
- ‘Edward Tyson, Rousseau and Monboddo’, in F. Spencer (ed.) History of Physical Anthropology: An Encyclopedia, New York: Garland (1996).
- ‘Rousseau’, in T. Mautner (ed.) Dictionary of Philosophy, Oxford: Blackwell (1996):372-373.
- ‘Four contributions (‘Buffon’, ‘Diderot’, ‘Enlightenment, Continental’ and ‘Monboddo’)’, in E. Craig (ed.) Routledge Encyclopedia of Philosophy, London: Routledge (1998).
- ‘Voltaire’ and ‘Rousseau’, in R.L. Arrington (ed.) A Companion to the Philosophers, Oxford: Blackwell (1999).
- ‘Two articles (‘Jean-Jacques Rousseau’ and ‘The Social Contract’)’, in Adam and Jessica Kuper (eds.) The Social Science Encyclopedia, London: Routledge (2004).
- ‘The Enlightenment’, in Dinah L. Shelton (ed.) The Encyclopedia of Genocide and Crimes Against Humanity, Macmillan: New York (2005):286-287.
- ‘Bonald’, ‘Burke’ and ‘Utilitarianism’ in J. Merman and J. Winter (eds.) Europe, 1789-1944: Encyclopedia of the Age of Industry and Empire, Detroit: C. Scribner's Sons (2006).

=== Other publications ===
- ‘On the Death of Malcolm X’, Clare Market Review, LXII.i (1965):22-25.
- ‘The Angels of Destruction Visit California (on the Los Angeles Race Riots)’, Clare Market Review, LXII.ii (1965):10-13.
- ‘Rousseau’s Politics’, Government and Opposition, VII.iv (1973):518-522.
- Review of several books on Rousseau, Philosophical Quarterly, XXIV (1974):281-284.
- ‘Rousseau’s Paradox’, Times Higher Education Supplement, 20 September 1974:18.
- Review article of two books on Burke, Political Studies, XXIV.iv (1974):486-490.
- ‘The analogies of Nature’ (review of A. Verri, Lord Monboddo. dalla metafisica all’antropologia), Times Literary Supplement, 11 March 1977:262-263.
- ‘The Enlightenment and the Revolution: Some Notes on Norman Hampson’s Variations on a Theme by Robert Darnton’, British Society for Eighteenth Century Studies Newsletter, XIII (1977):18-21.
- ‘The very rhythm of Rousseau’, Times Literary Supplement, 19 August 1977:995.
- ‘The Enlightenment Hostilities of Voltaire and Rousseau’ (feature article), Times Higher Education Supplement, 29 September 1978:9-10.
- ‘Descending into paranoia’ (review of three volumes of R.A. Leigh (ed.), Correspondance complète de Rousseau), Times Literary Supplement, 6 February 1981:143.
- ‘The Apes and Us’ (review of thirteen books on sociobiology and ethology), Quarto, XV (March 1981):5-7.
- ‘The great dissimulator’ (review of H.C. Mansfield, Jr., Machiavelli's New Modes and Orders), Times Higher Education Supplement, 10 April 1981:17.
- ‘Eminently enlightened’ (review of H. Mason, Voltaire), Times Literary Supplement, 16 October 1981:1216.
- ‘Adrift in a gene pool’ (review of P. Singer, The Expanding Circle: ethics and sociobiology), Times Higher Education Supplement, 2 February 1982:22.
- ‘A polity of nature’ (review of H. Howard, Darwin, and W. George, Darwin), Times Higher Education Supplement, 2 July 1982:17.
- ‘Critical dialectic’ (review of S. Rose (ed.), Against Biological Determinism and Towards a Liberatory Biology), Times Higher Education Supplement, 30 July 1982:15.
- ‘Natural slavery’ (review of A. Pagden, The Fall of Natural Man), Times Higher Education Supplement, 11 February 1983:15.
- ‘Balance of life’ (review of M. Barthelemy Madaule, Lamarck the Mythical Precursor), Times Higher Education Supplement, 25 March 1983:17.
- ‘The vagabondage of the philosophe’ (review of R.A. Leigh (ed.), Correspondance complète de Rousseau, vols. 37-40 and M. Cranston, Jean Jacques), Times Literary Supplement, 2 September 1983:919-920.
- ‘Founding a school for statesmanship’ (review of S. Collini, D. Winch, and J. Burrow, That Noble Science of Politics), Times Higher Education Supplement, 9 March 1984:15.
- ‘Look to nature’ (review of R. Brown, The Nature of Social Laws), Times Higher Education Supplement, 30 November 1984:17.
- Obituary notice for R.A. Leigh, The Daily Telegraph, 2 January 1988:12.
- Review article of J. Miller, Rousseau: Dreamer of Democracy, Journal of Modern History, LXI.2 (June 1989):380-381.
- ‘Liberty, egality and fratricide’ (‘Democracy and Terror in the French Revolution’), a feature article published in the Times Higher Education Supplement, 14 July 1989:15-16.
- ‘Introduction’ to A Catalogue of Saint Simon and Saint Simonianism, Wickmere, Norfolk (Merrion Book Company), 3pp.
- ‘Vagabondage’ (review of M. Cranston, The Noble Savage), New Statesman, 12 April 1991:36-37.
- ‘Introduction’ to A Catalogue of John Wilkes, Wickmere, Norfolk (Merrion Book Company), 1991, 5pp.
- ‘Prop forward’ (review of P.N. Furbank, Diderot: A Critical Biography), New Statesman, 8 May 1992:40.
- ‘Keeping it in the family’, review of P. Cavalieri and P. Singer (eds.) The Great Ape Project, Times Literary Supplement, 17 September 1993, reprinted in James Koobatian, The Thinking Reader, Belmont, Ca. (Wadsworth) 2002:5-6.
- Review article of Iain Hampsher-Monk, A History of Modern Political Thought, Political Studies, XLI.iv (1993):685.
- ‘Introduction’ to A Catalogue of Benjamin Franklin, Wickmere, Norfolk (Merrion Book Company), 1994, 3pp.
- ‘Singular Praise for a Pluralist’, review of John Gray, Isaiah Berlin, Times Higher Education Supplement, 3 March 1995:22.
- Review article of Claude Galipeau, Isaiah Berlin's Liberalism, Political Studies, XLIII.iii (1995):533-534.
- Review article of Yves Glaziou, Hobbes en France au XVIIIe siècle, History of European Ideas, 21.3 (1995):473-475.
- ‘Arguments for a deeper shade of green’, review of several works on ecology and environmental ethics, Times Literary Supplement, 8 September 1995:9.
- ‘Music and the moral voice’, review of volume V of the Pléiade Oeuvres complètes de Rousseau and of Michael O’Dea, Jean-Jacques Rousseau: Music, Illusion and Desire, Times Literary Supplement, 3 May 1996:8-9.
- ‘Laying the Enlightenment to Rest’, review of John Gray, Enlightenment’s Wake, Government and Opposition, 32.1 (1997):140-145.
- Review of William Sewell, A Rhetoric of Bourgeois Revolution: The Abbé Sieyes and What is the Third Estate?, Contemporary Sociology, 26.2 (1997):240-241.
- Review of Norbert Waszek, The Scottish Enlightenment and Hegel’s Account of ‘Civil Society’, Bulletin of the Hegel Society of Great Britain, 35 (1997):90-91.
- ‘A modern Candide’, review of Michael Ignatieff, Isaiah Berlin, and György Dalos, The Guest from the Future: Anna Akhmatova and Isaiah Berlin, Times Literary Supplement, 18 December 1998:7-8.
- Catalogue of a book exhibition commemorating Rousseau and Voltaire in the bicentenary year of their deaths (with D. Adams), John Rylands Library, University of Manchester, February 1978, 18 pp.
- Catalogue of the Library of John Plamenatz, London: Quaritch (2006).
- Numerous book reviews on Rousseau, Burke, Bentham, Tocqueville, the Enlightenment, utopian socialism, the philosophy of history, the history of modern political thought, French political theory, 1500-1800, on the political thought of Jürgen Habermas, and modern republicanism, in Political Studies; on Shaftesbury, Rousseau and Kant, in Ethics; and on the philosophy of history in History.
