= Rick Potts =

American archaeologist, prehistorian, anthropologist, and paleoanthropologist

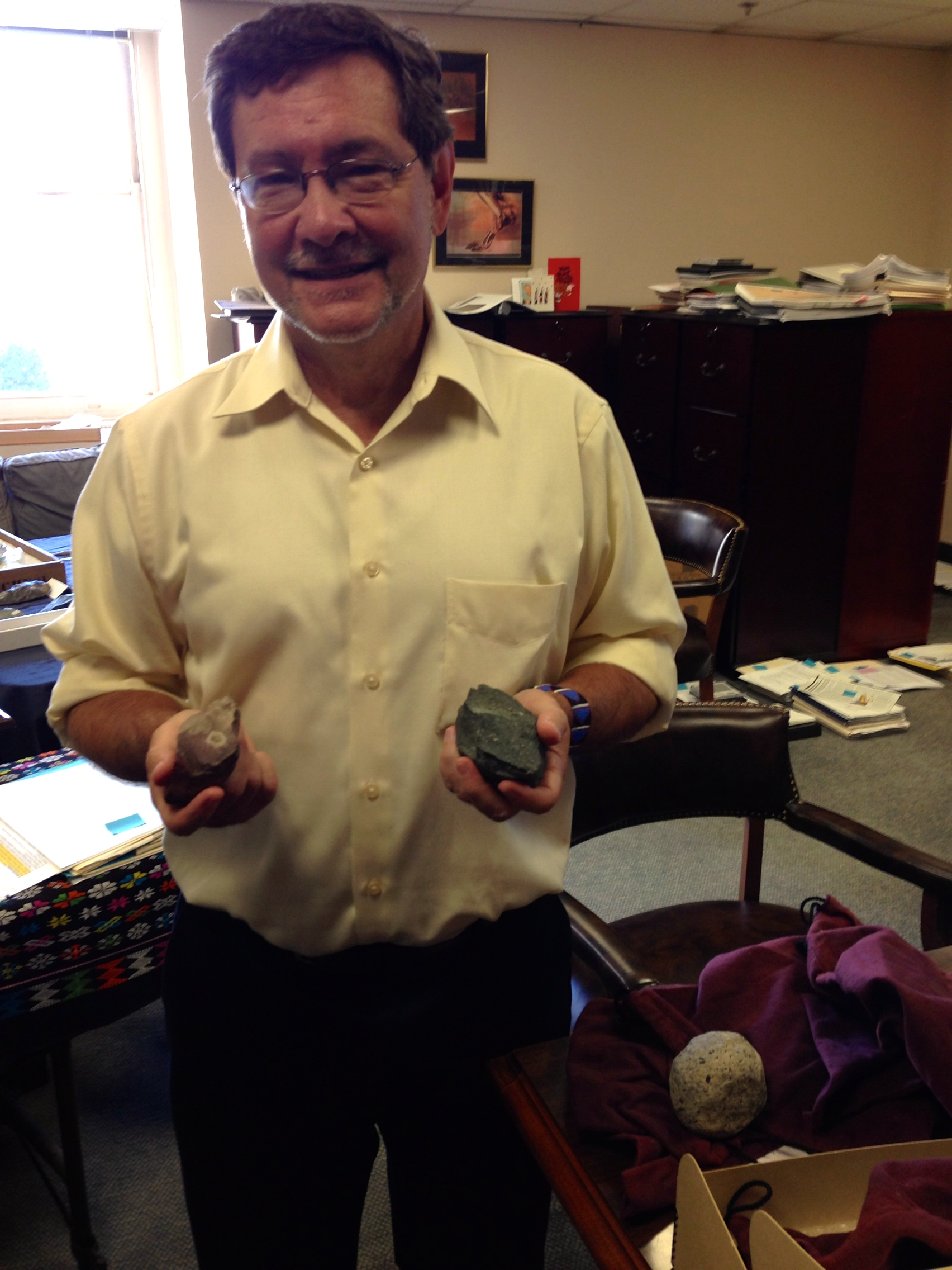
- Potts displaying Oldowan stone choppers, roughly 2 million years old. These are the oldest hominin tools in the Smithsonian.
- Scientific career
- Fields: Paleoanthropology
- Workplaces: Smithsonian Institution Museum of Natural History

Richard B. Potts is a paleoanthropologist and has been the director of the Smithsonian Institution Museum of Natural History's Human Origins Program since 1985. He is the curator of the David H. Koch Hall of Human Origins at the Smithsonian.

== Life ==
Potts and others interviewed at the Smithsonian in 2010

Potts graduated from Temple University in his hometown of Philadelphia. In 1982 Potts received his doctorate in biological anthropology from Harvard University. Prior to joining the Smithsonian Institution he taught at Yale University and was its Peabody Museum of Natural History curator of Physical Anthropology. He has been involved with early human excavation sites in Africa and Asia. His focus is on how human adaptation and evolution were in response to continuous changes in their environment over time.

== Selected publications ==
- Potts, Rick; Chris Sloan (2010-03-09). What Does It Mean to Be Human?. Washington, D.C: National Geographic. ISBN 9781426206061.
- Potts, Rick (1997-05-28). Humanity's Descent: The Consequences of Ecological Instability. William Morrow. ISBN 0380715236.

== See also ==
- Dawn of Humanity (2015 PBS film)
