= On Aggression =

1963 book by Konrad Lorenz

- Cover of the first edition
- Author: Konrad Lorenz
- Original title: Das sogenannte Böse
- Translator: Marjorie Latzke
- Language: German
- Subject: Behavioural science
- Publisher: Methuen Publishing
- Publication date: 1963
- Publication place: Austria
- English publication date: 1966
- Media type: Print (Hardcover and Paperback)
- Pages: 273
- ISBN: 978-0-415-28320-5
- OCLC: 72226348

On Aggression (German: Das sogenannte Böse. Zur Naturgeschichte der Aggression, "So-called Evil: on the natural history of aggression") is a 1963 book by the ethologist Konrad Lorenz; it was translated into English in 1966. As he writes in the prologue, "the subject of this book is aggression, that is to say the fighting instinct in beast and man which is directed against members of the same species." (Page 3)

The book was reviewed many times, both positively and negatively, by biologists, anthropologists, psychoanalysts and others. Much criticism was directed at Lorenz's extension of his findings on non-human animals to humans.

== Publication ==
On Aggression was first published in German in 1963, and in English in 1966. It has been reprinted many times and translated into at least 12 languages.

== Content ==
=== Programming ===
According to Lorenz, animals, particularly males, are biologically programmed to fight over resources, the primary purpose of which is to distance specimens of a species sufficiently far from each other to make the drain on local resources sustainable. This behavior must be considered part of natural selection, as aggression leading to death or serious injury may eventually lead to extinction unless it has such a role.

However, Lorenz does not state that aggressive behaviors are in any way more powerful, prevalent, or intense than more peaceful behaviors such as mating rituals. Rather, he negates the categorization of aggression as "contrary" to "positive" instincts like love, depicting it as a founding basis of other instincts and its role in animal communication.

=== Hydraulic model ===
The psycho-hydraulic model of Lorenz

Additionally, Lorenz addresses behavior in humans, including discussion of a "hydraulic" model of emotional or instinctive pressures and their release, shared by Freud's psychoanalytic theory, and the abnormality of intraspecies violence and killing. Lorenz claimed that "present-day civilized man suffers from insufficient discharge of his aggressive drive" and suggested that low levels of aggressive behaviour prevented higher level responses resulting from "damming" them. His 'hydraulic' model, of aggression as a force that builds relentlessly without cause unless released, remains less popular than a model in which aggression is a response to frustrated desires and aims.

=== Ritualization ===
In the book, Lorenz describes the development of rituals among aggressive behaviors as beginning with a totally utilitarian action, but then evolving to more and more stylized actions, until finally, the action performed may be entirely symbolic and non-utilitarian, now fulfilling a function of communication. In Lorenz's words:

Thus while the message of inciting [a particular aggressive behavior performed by the female of cooperating mated pairs] in ruddy shelduck and Egyptian geese could be expressed in the words 'Drive him off, thrash him!', in diving ducks [a related species in which this trait has been further ritualized] it simply means, 'I love you.' In several groups, midway between these two extremes, as for example in the gadwall and wigeon, an intermediate meaning may be found, 'You are my hero. I rely on you.'

== Reception ==
=== Favourable ===
J. L. Fischer, reviewing On Aggression in American Anthropologist in 1968, called it a "fascinating book by a distinguished animal ethologist" that would "annoy most social and cultural anthropologists" but nonetheless stated "an important thesis", namely that intraspecific aggression was "instinctive in man, as it can be shown to be in a number of other species." Fischer found Lorenz's account of nonhuman animals at the start of the book, written from Lorenz's own experience, "the most convincing and enlightening". Fischer noted that Lorenz acknowledges the role of culture in human life but that he perhaps underrated its effects on individual development. Fischer argued that Lorenz's view of the instinctive nature of human aggression was "basically right", commenting that "Lorenz would probably cite the fury of his critics as further proof of the correctness of his thesis".

Edmund R. Leach, comparing the book with Robert Ardrey's The Territorial Imperative in The New York Review of Books in 1966, calls On Aggression "no landmark, but .. modest and wise, while Ardrey's version is only noisy and foolish." Leach writes that where Ardrey focuses on territoriality, Lorenz aims to demonstrate that "animal aggression is only a 'so-called evil' and that its adaptive consequences are advantageous or at least neutral." Leach is however less sure that Lorenz is correct to equate animal and human aggression, the one taking standard ritualized forms, the other far more complex.

The mental health researcher Peter M. Driver reviewed the book in Conflict Resolution in 1967 alongside two by Ardrey and one by Claire Russell and W. M. S. Russell, Human Behavior – A New Approach. He commented that those against the book, especially S. A. Barnett, T. C. Schneirla, and Solly Zuckerman, were specialists in animal behaviour, while most of the favourable reviews came from "experts in other fields". Driver stated that Lorenz had provided a "powerful thesis" to explain the "aggression gone wrong" in humans, mentioning the millions of deaths in world wars, aggression resembling (Driver argued) the unlimited interspecific attack of a predator on its prey rather than the kind of intraspecific aggression seen in nonhuman animals which is strictly limited. Driver concluded that ethology could contribute, alongside neurophysiology and psychology, to resolving the problem of conflict.

=== Critical ===
The zoologists Richard D. Alexander and Donald W. Tinkle, comparing On Aggression with Ardrey's The Territorial Imperative in BioScience in 1968, noted that few books had been reviewed so often "or with as much vehemence in both defense and derogation" as these two. In their view, this was because both men had tried to write about a sensitive and important question, human nature and to what extent it is determined by evolution. They call On Aggression a personal commentary from a professional zoologist where Ardrey's book is a well-documented book by a non-biologist. Both, in their view, tend "to rekindle old, pointless arguments of the instinct vs. learning variety" and both include "some peculiarly nonevolutionary or antievolutionary themes."

The psychoanalyst Erich Fromm, writing in The New York Times in 1972, called Lorenz's theory "complicated and sometimes fuzzy". Fromm considered that in one way Lorenz had succeeded where Sigmund Freud had failed, Lorenz's hydraulic theory of aggression, innately programmed, being in Fromm's view a better explanation than Freud's opposed passions, the supposed drives for life (eros) and death or destruction (thanatos). However, Fromm noted that the ethologist Nico Tinbergen had rejected the hydraulic theory, and that Lorenz himself "modified it" in 1966, but without indicating that in the English translation of On Aggression. Fromm cites evidence from neuroscience that aggression is "essentially defensive", arising in "phylogenetically programed brain areas" for fight or flight when an animal or person feels threatened. Fromm points out that "self-propelling aggressiveness" is seen in people with brain disease, but not in "normal brain functioning".

The biologist E. O. Wilson, in On Human Nature (1978), argues that both Lorenz and Fromm are essentially wrong. He lists a variety of aggression categories, each separately subject to natural selection, and states that aggressive behavior is, genetically, one of the most labile of all traits. He maintains that aggression is a technique used to gain control over necessary resources, and serves as a "density-dependent factor" in population control. He argues against the "drive-discharge" model created by Freud and Lorenz, where substitute aggressive activities (such as combative sports) should reduce the potential for war, and in support of Richard G. Sipes's "culture-pattern" model, where war and substitute activities will vary directly. Wilson compares aggression to "a preexisting mix of chemicals ready to be transformed by specific catalysts that are added," rather than "a fluid that continuously builds pressure against the walls of its containers."

The evolutionary biologist Richard Dawkins described Lorenz in The Selfish Gene (1976) as a "'good of the species' man". He criticises On Aggression for its "gem of a circular argument" that aggressive behaviour has a "species preserving" function, namely to ensure "that only the fittest individuals are allowed to breed". In Dawkins's view, the idea of group selection was "so deeply ingrained" in Lorenz's thinking that he "evidently did not realize that his statements contravened orthodox Darwinian theory."

== See also ==
- Hunting hypothesis
- Killer ape theory
- Social defeat
