= Berdine Grünewald =

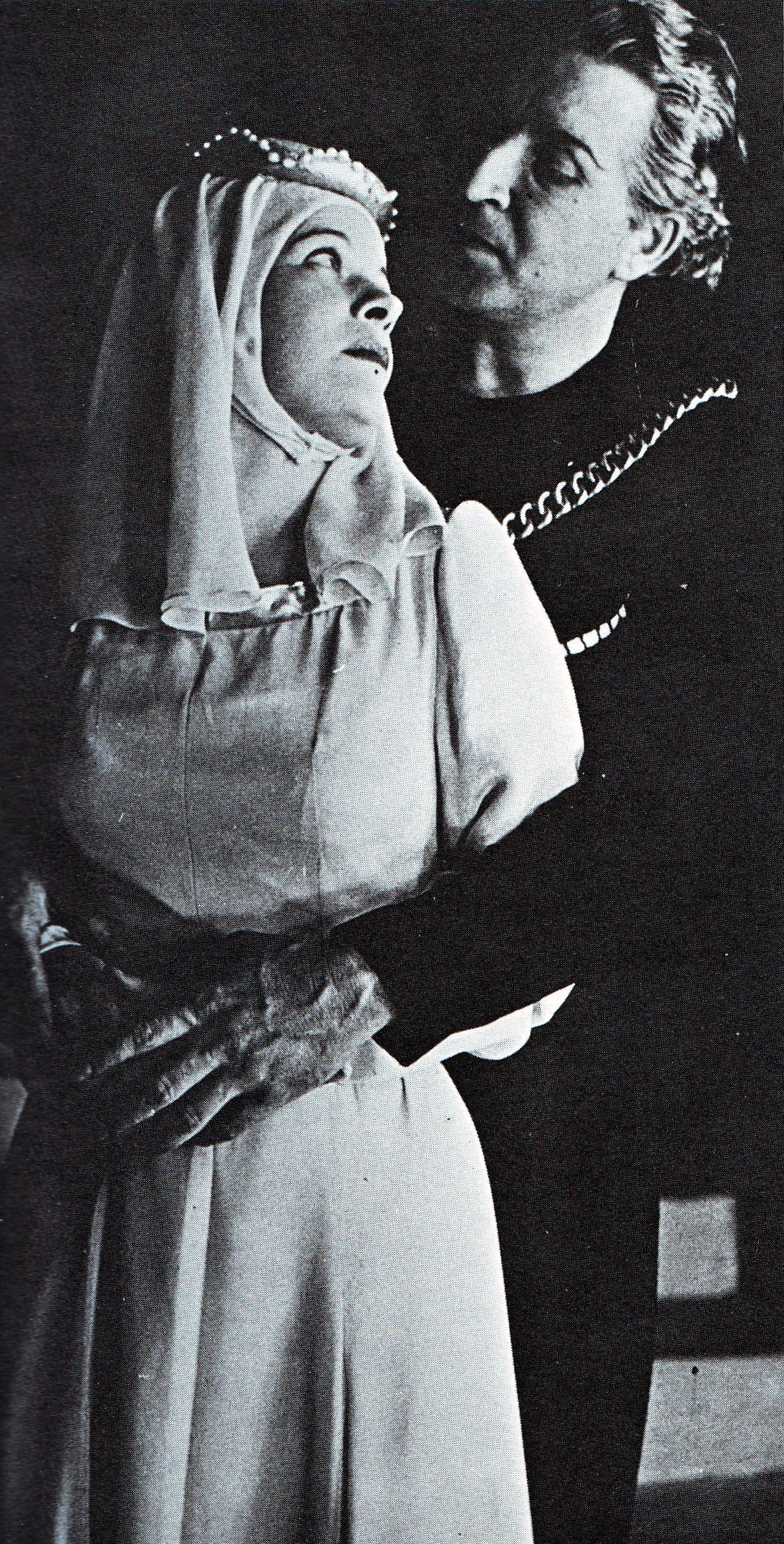
- André Huguenet as Hamlet and Berdine Grünewald as Ophelia in Hamlet in 1947.
- Born: Anne Berdine Grünewald; 15 August 1914
- Died: 7 August 1994 (aged 78); Cape Town, South Africa
- Occupations: Actress and illustrator
- Spouse(s): Barend Botha (m. 1939, divorced) Robert Ardrey (m. 1960; died 1980)

Berdine Grünewald (born Anne Berdine Grünewald, 15 August 1914 – 7 August 1994) was a South African actress.

== Career ==
Grünewald made her career break in 1935 with the role of Esther, originally played by Elsa Fouché, in Oom Paul, presented by Hendrik and Mathilde Hanekom's touring company. She stayed with the Hanekoms for a number of years before joining André Huguenet for Die Kwaksalwer in 1939. She also appeared at the Volksteater and with the National Theatre Organisation. She played opposite Huguenet as Ophelia in his Afrikaans-language version of Hamlet in 1947 and as Lady Macduff in Macbeth in 1950. She toured Australia in 1951 with the British Commonwealth Theatre Company. Her last stage performance in South Africa was in Die Dame met die Kamelias in 1966.

She also appeared in a small number of films: uncredited, in Zoltan Korda's film version of Cry, the Beloved Country (1951), Bladon Peake's Inspan (1953) and Gerrie Snyman's Die Leeu van Punda Maria (1954).

== Personal life ==
Grünewald married Barend Botha, a medical practitioner, in 1939. She then married American playwright Robert Ardrey on 11 August 1960.
