= Plays of Three Decades =

Plays of Three Decades: Thunder Rock/Jeb/Shadow of Heroes
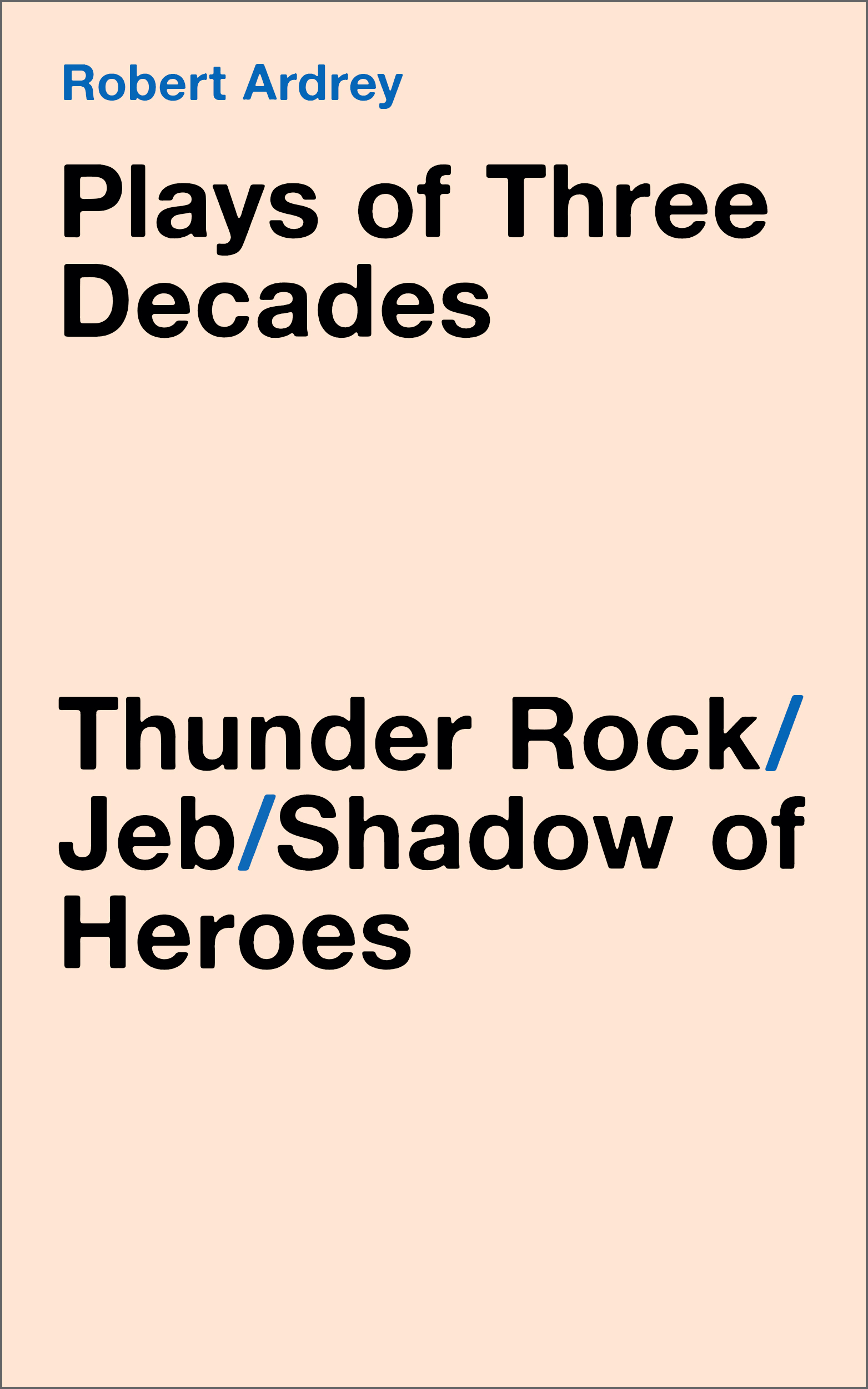
- Author: Robert Ardrey
- Language: English
- Genre: Drama
- Published: 1968 (Atheneum)
- Media type: Print
- Pages: 255
- ISBN: 978-0988604391

Plays of Three Decades is a collection of three plays by the prolific playwright, screenwriter, and science writer Robert Ardrey. The three plays included are Thunder Rock, Ardrey's international classic about hope and human progress; Jeb, Ardrey's post-World War II civil rights play about a black soldier returning from the Pacific; and Shadow of Heroes, a documentary drama about the prelude to and aftermath of the Hungarian Revolution of 1956. The last play resulted in the release of two political prisoners from Soviet custody.

== Preface ==
Plays of Three Decades includes a lengthy preface by the author entitled "A Preface to the Plays Including Certain Personal Reflections." The introduction includes information about Ardrey's personal relationship to the theater, but it is mainly concerned with detailing the history of the avant garde theater movement of 1930s New York which Ardrey identifies the plays as belonging to.

An avant garde theatre occurs when enough skeptical artists raise their voices in a common tune. The three plays presented in this volume might be dedicated to that avant garde theatre of which they were a part and which, born in the 1930s, died prematurely soon after the Second World War and like a tropical sunset left no afterglow. We had no real name for our kind of play in America. Sometimes we called it the Theatre of Social Protest, a phrase which scarcely did the plays justice. On the Continent it was called the théâtre engagé—the theatre engaged with its times—and that is the term I prefer."

Ardrey writes that the théâtre engagé was part of a larger flourishing of dramatic talent that began in 1920s New York. Among the playwrights important to this moment he identifies Eugene O'Neill, Sidney Howard, Maxwell Anderson, Elmer Rice, Marc Connelly, Philip Barry, S. N. Behrman, Robert E. Sherwood, George S. Kaufman, Moss Hart, Howard Lindsay, Russel Crouse, Charles MacArthur and Ben Hecht. But the necessity for an avant garde movement, he writes, came with the Great Depression.

Ardrey graduated from the University of Chicago in 1930, after having become the writing protege of Thornton Wilder. His graduation came during the beginning of the Great Depression. He writes that the lack of career prospects gave him plenty of time to write while he made a living on odd jobs. Among these were working (without qualifications) as a statistician, lecturing in anthropology at the Chicago World's Fair, conducting door-to-door surveys in Chicago's West Side slums, and forging medieval plainsongs.

He also writes that the Great Depression required that artists become engaged with the times. The beginning of serious engagement in the theater he identifies as Clifford Odets' play of 1935, Waiting for Lefty. Waiting for Lefty was produced by the radical theater collective the Group Theatre, who would eventually produce several of Ardrey's plays, including Thunder Rock.

Ardrey writes that after Waiting for Lefty many significant socially engaged plays followed: Sidney Kingsley's Dead End, Irwin Shaw's Bury the Dead, Odets' third play, Golden Boy, and Lillian Hellman's The Little Foxes and Watch on the Rhine. His own first three contributions to the movement were Star Spangled (produced in 1937), Casey Jones (1938), and How to Get Tough About It (also 1938). Though all three of these plays received significant critical praise the overall reviews were mixed and the plays were commercially unsuccessful. In recognition of Casey Jones, though, Ardrey was awarded a Guggenheim Fellowship for promise as a young playwright.

At the end of the decade, Ardrey writes, the Great Depression ceased to be the most important issue which a socially engaged theater would have to address. "The threat of war began to overshadow the reality of want." It was in response to this threat, motivated especially by the exigency of the Munich Agreement, that Ardrey wrote Thunder Rock.

== Thunder Rock ==
In his introduction to Plays of Three Decades Ardrey writes that he conceived of the play in New York following a long vacation to Nantucket. He wrote the play in New Orleans during the winter and spring of 1939.

Thunder Rock concerns a journalist, Charleston, who, distraught at the state of the world, withdraws into isolation as a lighthouse attendant. Amid the solitude he conjures in his imagination persons who drowned many years earlier when their steam-packet foundered in the lake. Charleston begins to argue with these characters, and in the process of refuting their hopelessness he comes to renounce his own. He rejoins the world of action.

The play, which called for American intervention in the crisis in Europe, was lambasted by American critics, who were by and large isolationist. In New York it received bad reviews and closed after a short run. However a production was mounted in a small theatre in wartime London, where it quickly garnered major attention and huge audiences. The critical response was rave, and the play became a symbol of British resistance. Following its success at the Neighbourhood Theatre it was transferred to the Globe, one of the largest theatres in London's West End, with secret funding from Her Majesty's Treasury.

Thunder Rock became known in Britain as the defining play of World War II.

== Jeb ==
Jeb was presented in 1946 by Herman Shumlin. It received widespread critical praise but failed to find popularity with audiences and also closed after a short run. According to the critical consensus, Jeb was far ahead of its time.

It is the story of a black veteran returning from service in the Pacific. During the war he has lost one of his legs, but he has gained the ability to run an adding machine. Back home in the rural south he seeks employment, but is faced with discrimination and violence. (For a full synopsis, see Jeb (play).)

== Shadow of Heroes ==
Shadow of Heroes, a play in five acts from the Hungarian Passion, was Robert Ardrey's last play. Written in 1958 and presented by Toby Rowland in October of the same year, it dramatized the events that led up to the Hungarian Revolution of 1956, as well as the brutal suppression that followed it. The play is in the style of a documentary drama, and is often cited as an early example of Verbatim theatre.

The play follows Lászlo Rajk and his wife, Julia, two members of the anti-Nazi Hungarian resistance. It details the arrest and torture of Lászlo, his signing of a false confession under the promise of safety for him and his family, and his subsequent trial and hanging. The play then follows Julia through the uprising and subsequent Soviet repression. The play depicts her arrest and ends with the announcement that she and her son are still under arrest. (For full synopsis see Shadow of Heroes.)

The play opened on October 7, 1958, at the Piccadilly Theatre in London and resulted in the release, just eleven days later, of Julia Rajk and her son.
