= Worlds Beginning =

1944 novel by Robert Ardrey

- First edition
- Author: Robert Ardrey
- Language: English
- Genre: Speculative fiction
- Published: 1944
- Publisher: Duell, Sloan & Pearce
- Publication place: United States
- Pages: 244

Worlds Beginning is a 1944 speculative fiction novel by Robert Ardrey. It proposed a new economic model and system of corporate ownership.

Worlds Beginning was published one year after God and Texas, Ardrey's one-act play about the Battle of the Alamo, and two years before the production of Jeb, Ardrey's Civil Rights play.

== Synopsis & Themes ==
The New York Times gave the following synopsis of the novel:

Twenty years from now a retired reporter takes time off from cultivating his petunias and his perennial border to write of his own experiences during the dark days after peace, when American civilization seemed about to crack up for good. The "myth of internationalism" had infected big business with a bad case of economic imperialism. But synthetic revolutions in industrial chemistry soon fixed things so foreign nations didn't need a thing we could sell them. Depression, unemployment, bankruptcies, hatred and fear plagued the country. The business-controlled Government was swept out of office by a labor popular front. But things got worse instead of better. ... [W]hile Americans everywhere sank into fatalistic apathy, a new hope was born in the desert town of Indian Pass in Texas, where the Trans-Pecos Chemical Commonwealth was making a plastic substitute for copper wire that was much cheaper and much better than copper. The significance lay in a new concept of ownership. ... The commonwealth idea got rid of all owners of property and also paid no wages, only shares in the earnings. The employees had no participation in the concern. The harder they worked and the more money the commonwealth made, the larger was their share of the earnings. Every foreman was subject to dismissal by a majority vote of the workers under him. Any lazy or inefficient worker was thrown out on his ear by his comrades. Efficiency was wonderful, morale perfect.

Worlds Beginning also includes a one-page foreword by the author in which he discusses his reasons for writing the novel. Included is his sense that during dark times there is hope for the future, but only if those concerned are willing to fight for it. This is a theme consistently developed throughout his work, including most notably in Thunder Rock, Ardrey's most famous play.

== Reception ==
Worlds Beginning was the subject of two dedicated reviews in The New York Times. The first, by Carlos Baker, appeared on September 24, 1944. The second, by Orville Prescott, appeared on September 27. Both offered praise.

Prescott asserted "Mr. Ardrey has written a novel with as thumping a thesis as Bellamy's 'Looking Backward,' or any other celebrated outlines of Utopia." Baker wrote of the book that it was: "fresh, tough, cocky, exciting, shot through with the exuberance of discovery. However he does it, with stiletto or meat cleaver, ad copywriter's slogans or heroic analogies, reiteration either plain or fancy, Mr. Ardrey clears a path for the reader through the jungle of economics and brings him out, flushed and panting, to a new world in the making."

In 1948 Worlds Beginning was included in Everett F. Bleiler's The Checklist of Fantastic Literature.
