= Boy Meets Girl (play) =

1935 play by Bella and Samuel Spewack

- Original language: English
- Written by: Bella and Samuel Spewack
- Subject: Farce on events in a film studio
- Genre: Comedy
- Setting: The fictional Royal Studio in Hollywood, 1935.

Premiere
- Date: November 27, 1935
- Place: Cort Theatre, New York City
- Directed by: George Abbott

Boy Meets Girl is a three-act, seven-scene play, written by Bella and Samuel Spewack, staged and produced by George Abbott. It is a farce with a large cast, fast pacing, two settings and a film sequence. The action centers around two scenarists at the Royal Studios in Hollywood, their volatile producer, the fading western actor they write for, and a pregnant single waitress whose baby they turn into a film star. The play's title comes from a trope common to early film plots: Boy Meets Girl, Boy Loses Girl, Boy Gets Girl. Though not original to the play, the phrase received a boost in popular usage as a result.

The set designs were by Arne Lundborg. The show was a critical and popular success, winning the Dramatists Guild award for Best Comedy of the Season. It ran for twenty months on Broadway, closing after 669 performances. It was adapted for film in 1938, but had only two minor revivals on Broadway in later decades.

== Characters ==
Characters are listed in order of appearance within their scope.

=== Leads ===
- Robert Law is a thirtyish scenarist from Vermont at Royal Studios, an advocate of realism. Supposed to represent Charles MacArthur.
- Larry Toms is a somewhat sullen, puritanical, and self-absorbed fading western star at Royal Studios.
- J. Carlyle Benson is Law's older creative partner, expensively married, yet a romanticist. Thought to be based on Ben Hecht.
- C. Elliot Friday (C.F.) is a mercurial producer, the only college graduate at Royal Studios. Attributed to Irving Thalberg.
- Susie Seabrook is a pregnant single waitress, whose husband turned out to be a bigamist. Her goal is to finish high school.

=== Supporting ===
- Rossetti is the vulpine agent for Larry Toms, an opportunist and an impartial guller of clients.
- Miss Crews is Mr. Friday's cool, collected secretary, always popping in and out with messages and unwelcome news.
- Rodney Bevans is a proud young scion of English nobility, currently employed as an extra at the studio.
- Green is a studio songwriter who is a target of Law's mischief, C.F.'s ire, and Miss Crews' wit.
- Otto Slade is Green's composer partner, who has only three lines but plays piano onstage.

=== Featured ===
- Peggy is a manicurist who works on C.F.'s nails in the first act and disavows any interest in seeing a Larry Toms movie.
- A Nurse appears briefly in Act II Scene 2 pushing a pram with Happy in it.
- Doctor appears briefly in Act II Scenes 2 and 3.
- Chauffeur is assigned to Susie; called Simpson by her, he delivers her high school algebra book in Act II Scene 2.
- A Young Man located by Miss Crews in Act II Scene 2 for Susie, who is looking for Rodney but doesn't know his name.
- Studio Officer is a studio policeman called Smitty, who appears briefly in Act II Scene 3.
- Cutter is a film editor at Royal Studios, called Simmons by C.F., who appears briefly in Act II Scene 3.
- Another Nurse is seen in Act III Scene 1 interacting with Susie and Larry.
- Major Thompson is a middle-aged English gentleman, who confirms Bevan's identity in the last scene.

=== Voice-only ===
- B.K. is the Royal Studio chief executive, heard only thru an intercom, supposedly based on Louis B. Mayer.
- Radio Announcer is an emcee broadcasting live from the film premiere, and later on a radio spot.

=== Film-only ===
- Happy is Susie's baby boy, seen only on film at the beginning of Act II.

== Synopsis ==
"The story is too crack-brained to be intelligibly recorded here". --Brooks Atkinson

== Original production ==
=== Background ===
The Spewacks had worked on the screenplay for Rendezvous at MGM studios during 1934; Boy Meets Girl was based on experiences and personalities they had encountered there. The first public announcement of it came when George Abbott put it on his production schedule during October 1935. Rehearsals started October 27, 1935. The first cast announcements came a day later, with Jerome Cowan, Joyce Arling, Charles McClelland, Royal Beal, and for a while Broderick Crawford, selected for the play.

George Abbott revealed to Victor Knox of the Buffalo Evening News that Warner Brothers had helped finance the play, but he and the Spewacks controlled the production. He further emphasized that the studio's stake amounted to only a quarter interest, and would play little part in determining film rights.

=== Cast ===
Cast during the tryout in Philadelphia and the original Broadway run
Role	Actor	Dates	Notes
Robert Law	Allyn Joslyn	Nov 18, 1935 - Feb 20, 1937	After 524 performances, Joslyn left for Hollywood.
Robert Law	Roy Roberts	Feb 22, 1937 - Jun 19, 1937	
Larry Toms	Charles McClelland	Nov 18, 1935 - Nov 28, 1936	
Larry Toms	Don Douglas	Nov 30, 1936 - Jun 19, 1937	
J. Carlyle Benson	Jerome Cowan	Nov 18, 1935 - May 30, 1936	Cowan left to make movies in Hollywood.
J. Carlyle Benson	Millard Mitchell	Jun 01, 1936 - Jun 19, 1937	
Mr. Friday (C.F.)	Royal Beal	Nov 18, 1935 - Jun 19, 1937	One night Beal suffered a burst appendix in Act I, but finished the performance after a shot of morphine.
Susie	Joyce Arling	Nov 18, 1935 - Apr 17, 1937	This was Arling's first starring and fourth stage role, all for George Abbott productions.
Susie	TBD	Apr 19, 1935 - Jun 19, 1937	Took over role when Arling was sent to a new road company by George Abbott.
Rossetti	Everett H. Sloane	Nov 18, 1935 - Jun 19, 1937	
Miss Crews	Lea Penman	Nov 18, 1935 - Jun 19, 1937	
Rodney Bevans	James MacColl	Nov 18, 1935 - Jun 1937	Audiences were convinced MacColl was really English, but he was actually a NYC native.
Rodney Bevans	Richard Waring	Jun 1937 - Jun 19, 1937	
Green	Garson Kanin	Nov 18, 1935 - Feb 22, 1936	Kanin left to join the cast of Star Spangled only to see it flop.
Green	Jerry Sloane	Feb 24, 1936 - Apr 04, 1936	Sloane was promised a role in the next road company for yielding the part to Kanin again.
Green	Garson Kanin	Apr 06, 1936 - May 1, 1937	
Green	Will Lee	May 3, 1937 - Jun 05, 1937	
Green	Sidney Andrews	Jun 07, 1937 - Jun 19, 1937	
Otto Slade	Maurice Sommers	Nov 18, 1935 - Jun 19, 1937	Sommers was the only cast member to never miss a performance during the entire run.
Peggy	Peggy Hart	Nov 18, 1935 - Mar 14, 1936	Hart left the play to get married.
Peggy	Julie Lawrence	Mar 16, 1936 - May 2, 1936	
Peggy	Edith Van Cleve	May 4, 1936 - Jun 1937	She was a production assistant for George Abbott and simultaneously in the cast of Three Men on a Horse.
Peggy	Barbara Leeds	Jun 1937 - Jun 19, 1937	
A Nurse	Helen Gardner	Nov 18, 1935 - Jun 19, 1937	
Doctor	Perry Ivins	Nov 18, 1935 - Jun 19, 1937	
Chauffeur	Edison Rice	Nov 18, 1935 - Dec 21, 1936	Rice left to join the cast of the second company opening in Chicago.
Chauffeur	Juan Varro	Dec 23, 1936 - Jun 1937	Varro was also an assistant stage manager.
Chauffeur	Unknown	Jun 1937 - Jun 19, 1937	This character was dropped from the theater program after May 1937
A Young Man	Philip Faversham	Nov 18, 1935 - Jun 1937	He was the son of William Faversham and Julie Opp.
A Young Man	Carl Frank	Jun 1937 - Jun 19, 1937	
Studio Officer	George W. Smith	Nov 18, 1935 - Jun 1937	Besides acting, Smith also served as stage manager for the play.
Studio Officer	Juan Varro	Jun 1937 - Jun 19, 1937	
Cutter	Robert Foulk	Nov 18, 1935 - Jun 1937	Foulk was also an assistant stage manager for this play.
Cutter	George W. Smith	Jun 1937 - Jun 1937	
Another Nurse	Marjorie Lytell	Nov 18, 1935 - Feb 22, 1936	She was the wife of Philip Faversham, also in this play.
Another Nurse	Georgette McKee	Feb 24, 1935 - Jun 19, 1937	McKee took over when Lytell left to appear in Star Spangled.
Another Nurse	Barbara Leeds	Nov 18, 1935 - Jun 1937	
Another Nurse	Unknown	Jun 1937 - Jun 19, 1937	This character was dropped from the theater program after May 1937
Major Thompson	John Clarke	Nov 18, 1935 - Jun 19, 1937	Clarke was an English opera singer whom Abbott persuaded to take this straight dramatic role.
Happy	Judith Ann Roy		Though the character was a boy, the second act film sequence was played by George Abbott's niece.

=== Tryouts ===
Boy Meets Girl had its sole tryout at the Broad Street Theatre in Philadelphia, opening on November 18, 1935, for a week-long run. Both local reviewers were positive about the play and cast, predicting Broadway success for it, and neither had any suggestions for improvement. One mentioned the rumor that the screenplay writer characters of Robert Law and J. Carlyle Benson were based on Charles MacArthur and Ben Hecht. The same reviewer labelled the farce as "a satire without the ire" and thought it a burlesque.

The critics may have had no suggestions, but according to George Abbott audiences reacted negatively to one part of the film sequence, showing C.F. auditioning babies for the part of Happy. Viewers felt sorry for the infants who didn't get the job, so that first part of the film sequence was cut after Philadelphia.

=== Premiere ===
The Broadway debut for Boy Meets Girl occurred at the Cort Theatre on November 27, 1935. Columnist Rowland Field spotted Ben Hecht, George M. Cohan, Richard Rodgers, Lorenz Hart, Irving Berlin, Herbert Bayard Swope, Helen Lynd, Philip Dunning, and Max Gordon among the first-night crowd. Burns Mantle noted the audience's laughter "frequently rose to shrieks and seldom dwindled to anything as non-committal as a giggle".

=== Reception ===
Arthur Pollock in the Brooklyn Daily Eagle said: "There are plays so bad that to dismiss them with a line is to overestimate them. And there are plays so good description seems superfluous. Boy Meets Girl is nothing more than a knockout". He felt that Boy Meets Girl successfully stood comparison with Once in a Lifetime, an earlier satire on Hollywood, as well as with George Abbott's own Broadway. As for the play's two screenwriters being based on real-life figures, Pollock was dismissive: "Some say the two are meant to be Ben Hecht and Charles MacArthur, but the play proves that that rumor has no foundation. They are too funny."

Both Burns Mantle in the Daily News and Brooks Atkinson in The New York Times attributed much of the play's success to George Abbott's casting and direction. Atkinson called it "an extraordinarily hilarious comedy" and stated: "George Abbott has cast it and directed it with uncommon exactitude and vitality".

By March 22, 1936, the play had had over 145,000 viewers, with an average weekly gross of $18,000 and advance sales of $70,000, and was coming up to its 150th performance on April 1, 1936. (Note: This was for the Cort Theatre in New York, and did not include figures from the second company at the Selwyn Theatre in Chicago.)

=== Change of Venue ===
Boy Meets Girl gave its last performance at the Cort Theatre on May 15, 1937, opening at the Ambassador Theatre on May 17, 1937. The move was to make way for George Abbott's new comedy, Room Service, and was accompanied by a 50% discount on ticket prices.

=== Closing ===
The original Broadway run closed at the Ambassador Theatre on June 19, 1937, after 669 performances.

== Second Company ==
Three weeks after the Broadway premiere, the sale of advance tickets was such that George Abbott announced that a second company of the Broadway production would open in Chicago on January 19, 1936. The second company would star Polly Walters, Eric Dressler, Harold Vermilyea, and Philip Van Zandt. Before doing short tryout runs in Buffalo, New York and Cincinnati, Ohio, there was a morning preview of it before a picked audience of players and other stage folks at the Cort Theatre.

The first tryout opened at the Erlanger Theatre in Buffalo on January 6, 1936. The play's opening dialogue was punctured by an unexpected intruder, a yowling gray cat so vocal it drowned out lines in the first act. Stage crew members chased it up and down the aisles and across the orchestra pit to the delight of the audience, before it disappeared into the basement.

The second tryout opened at the Cox Theatre in Cincinnati on January 12, 1936. One local reviewer said: "What the poverty of the English language forces me to call the plot of Boy Meets Girl revolves about the antics of two pleasantly insane scenarists. From the curtain's rise there is not a dull, and scarcely a lucid, moment...".

The second company's premiere opened at the Selwyn Theatre in Chicago on January 19, 1936. Charles Collins of The Chicago Tribune was impressed: "The casting of the various types is adroit; the stage direction by George Abbott... is keen and brisk; and the acting is skilfull and merry". The second company closed its run at the Selwyn Theater on May 2, 1936, after which it became the touring company for Boy Meets Girl, visiting cities in the Midwest.

== Adaptions and revivals ==
=== Stage Revivals ===
On June 22, 1943, a revival was mounted at the Windsor Theatre by Lucia Victor's New York Stock company, with Rodney Hale directing. The production, for a limited engagement of two weeks, starred Joey Faye, Lewis Charles, Sara Lee Harris, and Norman MacKay. Burns Mantle in the Daily News gave a brief review, saying it was adequate "so long as the audience is confined to patrons without memories of the original production".

A second revival was mounted in April 1976 by the Phoenix Theatre repertory company at the Playhouse Theatre on 48th Street. Directed by John Lithgow, it starred Lenny Baker, Charles Kimbrough, Mary Beth Hurt, and Frederick Coffin. The production was panned by one reviewer, who said: "The humor of its jokes has gone flat over time", and suggested Lithgow should stick to acting.

=== Film ===
Boy Meets Girl was adapted for Boy Meets Girl (1938 film), directed by Lloyd Bacon and starring James Cagney, Pat O'Brien, Marie Wilson, Dick Foran, and Ralph Bellamy. Films and television shows with the same title from subsequent years are different stories.
