= The Brotherhood of Fear =

1952 novel by Robert Ardrey

- Author: Robert Ardrey
- Language: English
- Published: (1952) Random House; (2014) StoryDesign LTD (Kindle edition)
- Pages: 342

The Brotherhood of Fear is a 1952 political novel by Robert Ardrey. It was optioned for a film by Fox and re-issued in 2014.

== Synopsis ==
The novel concerns a prisoner who has escaped detention in a totalitarian future state.

The fugitive, Willy Bryo, is pursued by a police officer named Konnr. The pursuit leads the two across a survey of the totalitarian state, until they both shipwreck on a utopian island not under the governance of the state. The two intruders disturb the homeostasis of the island, and, by the conclusion of the novel, the fugitive is leading a posse of locals to hunt down his pursuer.

== Legacy ==
The reviewer for The New York Times wrote that the novel "exhibited the same craftsmanship that distinguished [Ardrey's] writing for the theater." He also drew a connection between the novel and Ardrey's most famous theatrical work, Thunder Rock.

Like his play, Thunder Rock (which was produced in both New York and London, and, somehow, never quite attracted the attention it deserved), The Brotherhood of Fear is first and last an allegory for our time.

The novel touched on many themes that would continue to be important in Ardrey's work. In particular, it explored questions about the rationales for and implications of human violence, and the connections between interpersonal violence and state violence. Ardrey would continue to consider these questions throughout his career, especially in his paleoanthropological work such as African Genesis and The Territorial Imperative.

In 1952 Julian Blaustein, executive producer at Twentieth Century-Fox, purchased the film rights for The Brotherhood of Fear, with the intention that Ardrey would be engaged to write the screenplay. However the project never reached fruition.

In 2014 The Brotherhood of Fear was reissued by StoryDesign LTD. in a Kindle edition.
