= Star Spangled =

Play written by Robert Ardrey

- Playbill from the original Broadway production
- Written by: Robert Ardrey
- Characters: Mrs. Mary Dzieszienewski, Gregory, Stan, Vincent, Anna, Professor Niebieski, Czysko, Steve, Masters
- Original language: English
- Subject: Polish-American immigrants
- Genre: Comedy
- Setting: Northwestern Chicago

Premiere
- Date premiered: 1936
- Place premiered: John Golden Theatre, Broadway, New York City

Star Spangled is a 1936 comedic play by Robert Ardrey. It was his first play produced on Broadway and resulted in Ardrey being awarded a Guggenheim fellowship.

== Story ==
Brooks Atkinson, writing for The New York Times, gave this description of the play:

Somewhere in the northwest side of Chicago in the Polish district live the Dzieszienewskis, the mother being an immigrant, the children being assimilated Americans and ambitious. She is an unprincipled strumpet whose blood boils in the Spring. Taking America as they have learned it from notorious Americans, her children are versatile nincompoops. One son is a melancholy baseball player in the Texas League, another is studying to be a cheap politician, a third is president of the Killers Club in the State penitentiary, and the daughter is a chorus girl who dreams of Hollywood.

The plot of the play revolves around the imprisoned son, who has escaped for a weekend in order to see his family, and incidentally, to kill the Polish politician who set him up eight years earlier. He plans on returning to prison before he is known to be missing.

== Writing & Production ==
Ardrey originally conceived of the play while "pushing through snowdrifts one long hard winter on a door-to-door survey in West Side slums." He wrote that his experience of the turmoil of the Great Depression "had been anything but unique. For me, the creative consequence was the conviction that the Polish-American characters of my first play were far more amusing and meaningful than the personnel of a normal theatrical penthouse." The artistic concern with portraying folk voices would be a consistent theme throughout Ardrey's career, including in his most famous play, Thunder Rock.

Ardrey originally called the play House on Fire, but changed the title on the suggestion of Arthur Hopkins. He spent significant time revising his first draft with input from Jed Harris, Ben Hecht, Charles MacArthur, and George Abbott. Abbott originally bought the option on the play in the summer of 1935, but let the option lapse. It was then bought by Hopkins, who produced the original Broadway staging.

Following a preview in New Haven, Star Spangled was produced on Broadway in 1936. The settings were by Raymond Sovey; it was staged and produced by Arthur Hopkins and played at the John Golden Theatre. The cast included Natasha Boleslavsky, George Tobias, Millard Mitchell, Garson Kanin, Marjorie Lytell, Ivan Triesault, Michael Visaroff, Donald Arbury, and Edward Craven.

== Reception ==
Star Spangled received mostly lukewarm reviews, but Ardrey's sense of humor was widely praised.

The original New York Times review opened, "If humorous implications were enough, 'Star Spangled' ... would be the comedy of the season. ... [Ardrey's] sense of the ridiculous is unhackneyed and keen," and went on to say, "Mr. Hopkins [has not] done much building on the script. But it is easy to share his enthusiasm for the quality of Mr. Ardrey's sense of humor." The Brooklyn Daily Eagle called it a "Strange and oddly comical play—the kind of play that gets remembered," while the New York Evening Journal applauded its "humorous gusto and relish," calling it "Vastly amusing."

Ardrey's humor was also praised after the preview in New Haven: "Walter Prichard Eaton, head of the play-writing classes at the Yale school, said after tonight's play that it tapped a rich vein of stage humor hitherto not drawn upon. ... He complimented the young author."

Despite being neither a popular nor critical success, the play won Ardrey attention from several major figures who would end up being influential in his career. In particular George Abbott, Sidney Howard, and Arthur Hopkins became interested in Ardrey, and, together with Thornton Wilder, Ardrey's writing mentor, all saw promise in the play. Due to their interventions, in particular the intervention of Howard, Ardrey was awarded a Guggenheim Fellowship in recognition of the play. The fellowship allowed him the financial freedom to write his next two plays, Casey Jones and How to Get Tough About It, both of which opened in 1938.
