= Reri Grist =

American opera singer (born 1932)

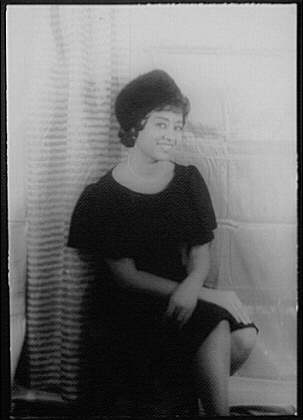
Reri Grist (1959) Photo by Carl Van Vechten

Reri Grist (born February 29, 1932) is an American coloratura soprano, one of the pioneer African-American singers to enjoy a major international career in opera.

== Life and career ==
Reri Grist was born in New York City, grew up in the East River Housing Projects, attended the High School of Music & Art, majored in voice, and graduated with a BA in music from Queens College, City University of New York.

In her early teens she performed on Broadway in small roles with Ossie Davis and Ruby Dee, including Robert Ardrey's 1946 play Jeb; and in musicals with Eartha Kitt while taking voice lessons with her teacher, Claire Gelda. Her first opera engagement was as Madame Herz in a concert performance of Mozart's Der Schauspieldirektor. Her first staged "operatic" engagement was in 1956 as Cindy Lou (Micaela) in Carmen Jones, Oscar Hammerstein's adaptation of Bizet's Carmen.

She was Consuelo in the original production of Leonard Bernstein's musical West Side Story in 1957, introducing the song "Somewhere" to the public; she also sang it on the original cast album. One of her earliest breakthroughs in classical music came in 1960 when Bernstein engaged her to sing the soprano part in Gustav Mahler's Symphony No. 4 in G major with the New York Philharmonic in a Young People's Concert at Carnegie Hall. Grist was also featured in Bernstein's 1960 Columbia recording of the Mahler symphony.

In following years, Grist appeared with the orchestra under the batons of Bernstein, Nadia Boulanger, Pierre Boulez, and Michael Gielen. Her operatic debut was at the Santa Fe Opera in 1959, as Adele in Die Fledermaus, followed by Blondchen in Die Entführung aus dem Serail. Igor Stravinsky attended the performance and invited her to perform his Le Rossignol with him conducting at the Washington Opera Society.

Her first European appearance was at the Cologne Opera in 1960 as the Queen of the Night in Mozart's The Magic Flute. From 1960–1966 she was a member of the Zurich Opera, where she first performed Zerbinetta in Ariadne auf Naxos, Sophie in Der Rosenkavalier, Adina in L'elisir d'amore, and Gilda in Rigoletto. After her successes in Zurich, she found herself much in demand, leading to her debuts at the Royal Opera House Covent Garden in Le Coq d'Or and at the Glyndebourne Festival in 1962, followed by the Vienna State Opera in 1963, where she performed for twenty-five seasons.

In the same year, Grist first sang at the San Francisco Opera as Rosina in Il barbiere di Siviglia. Throughout twelve consecutive seasons there, she added to her repertoire Oscar in Un ballo in maschera, Manon in Massenet's Manon and Susanna in Le nozze di Figaro.

In 1964, she made an acclaimed debut as Zerbinetta at the Salzburg Festival, where she performed throughout twelve seasons in Mozart and R. Strauss operas conducted by Karl Böhm, Zubin Mehta and Herbert von Karajan.

Grist's Metropolitan Opera debut on February 25, 1966, was as Rosina in Il barbiere di Siviglia. Additional roles throughout thirteen seasons included Gilda, Oscar, Olympia, Sophie and Zerbinetta.

From 1965 to 1987, she performed regularly at the Bayerische Staatsoper Munich in new productions, among which were Richard Strauss' Die schweigsame Frau, Falstaff, Le Nozze di Figaro, and Il barbiere di Siviglia. Guest appearances included performances at Lyric Opera of Chicago, Deutsche Oper Berlin, La Scala Milano, Buenos Aires, Holland Festival, and Die Wiener Festwochen.

Grist ended her operatic career in 1991 at De Nederlandse Opera, Amsterdam, in the one-woman opera, Neither by Morton Feldman/Samuel Beckett, directed by Pierre Audi. In that year, she also sang the role of "the Italian Singer" in the San Francisco Opera production of Capriccio by Richard Strauss.

Grist has held professorships in voice at the School of Music, Indiana University Bloomington and at the Hochschule für Musik und Theater Munich.

Honors include the title of Bayerische Kammersängerin awarded to her in 1976 and a Legacy Award of the American Opera Association in 2001.

Grist lives in Germany with her husband, orchestra administrator Dr. Ulf Thomson.

== Filmography ==
- Ariadne auf Naxos (1965), Zerbinetta
- Le nozze di Figaro (1966), Susanna
- Don Pasquale (1972), Norina
- Un ballo in maschera (1975), Oscar
- Die Entführung aus dem Serail (1980), Blondchen
- Die schweigsame Frau (1972), Aminta
- Reri Grist – Singer, (1976), director Axel Corti
- Da Capo with August Everding, (1996)
- Tatort, Bayerischer Rundfunk, (1996)
- Aida's Brothers and Sisters, Marieke Schroeder
- Opera is Theatre/Oper ist Theater, (2002) Marieke Schroeder
