= How to Get Tough About It =

- Playbill for original Broadway production
- Written by: Robert Ardrey
- Characters: Kitty, Dan Grimshaw, Dokey, Joe, Mannheim, Vergez, Billy Boy, Mrs. Clugg, Peschino, Clugg, Susie, Matt Grogan, Eldridge, Powers
- Original language: English
- Setting: American Midwest

Premiere
- Date premiered: 1938
- Place premiered: Martin Beck Theater, Broadway, New York City

How to Get Tough About It is a 1938 dramatic play by Robert Ardrey.

== Production ==
How to Get Tough About It is Robert Ardrey's third play, preceded by Star Spangled and Casey Jones, the latter of which opened on Broadway within ten days of it. Ardrey's next play, Thunder Rock, is his most famous.

How to Get Tough About it opened on Broadway in 1938. It was presented by Guthrie McClintic, who bought the script after a single reading. The production starred Katherine Locke and Myron McCormick, who were praised for their acting. Brooks Atkinson, reviewing for the New York Times, wrote "In their scenes together Miss Locke and Mr. McCormick act with fervent sincerity that is beautifully matched and one of the acting treasures of this stirring season."

== Story ==
The author described the play as "A proletarian love story of pleasant dimensions." It tells the story of Kitty, an independent-minded waitress in a cheap cafe in a Midwestern industrial district, and Dan Grimshaw, "a boat-builder with more pride in craft than business sense." Atkinson gives the following summary:

She has been in love with an amiable thug who promotes himself to labor union racketeering, and has coldly deserted her. By force of circumstances the waitress and the boat-builder are thrown together on the houseboat, where he lives on the mudflats, and they find that their notions of life are congenial. During a bogus strike the racketeer comes back, claims his old girl and takes her. The rest of the play is the story of how the uncontaminated pair learn how to get tough about it and save the decencies of their private principles in a world that is seething with violent corruption.

== Reception ==
How to Get Tough About It opened two years after Ardrey's first play, Star Spangled. Star Spangled had been commercially unsuccessful, but had garnered Ardrey a reputation on Broadway, as well as notice from important figures. In particular George Abbott, Sidney Howard, Thornton Wilder, and Arthur Hopkins all saw promise in the play, and due to their interventions Ardrey was awarded the Guggenheim Fellowship that allowed him the financial freedom to write Casey Jones and How to Get Tough About it. These two plays opened ten days apart and both also failed to find popularity with audiences, though reviews were mixed. His fourth play, Thunder Rock, was also a failure on Broadway, before it became a massive international success.
