= Sing Me No Lullaby =

- Playbill from the original New York production
- Written by: Robert Ardrey
- Characters: Mike Hertzog, Christine Collinger, Ben Collinger, Clay Dixon, Abe Levene, Maddy Hertzog, Fanny Collinger, Johnny Colton Smith, Parrish
- Original language: English
- Setting: Illinois

Premiere
- Date premiered: October 14, 1954
- Place premiered: Phoenix Theatre, New York City

Sing Me No Lullaby is a 1954 play by Robert Ardrey. It is about the treatment of accused communists in post-Cold War America. It was originally presented at the off-Broadway Phoenix Theatre in New York City.

== Synopsis ==
Brooks Atkinson gives the following description of Sing Me No Lullaby.

Some Illinois college friends of 1938 [ ] have a country reunion at Christmas of the present time. As students, most of them had what were known as progressive political ideas in 1938. One of them, a brilliant mathematician, placed his faith in Soviet Russia then. The Stalin-Hitler pact shook all that faith out of him in 1939. By the present time he is one of the dispossessed. Because of his college political associations, no one will employ him, no one will rent him an apartment, no one will associate with him, no one will clear him, no one will adjudicate his case.

== Reception ==
Sing Me No Lullaby received praise for its political content. The New York Times asserted that "The third act of Sing Me No Lullaby constitutes the most forceful statement anyone has made in the theatre for ages." Richard Watts wrote that Ardrey was "striving with the most obvious sincerity to probe the unhealthy and hysterical political climate of America in the wake of the cold war."

Atkinson (quoted above) goes on:

Mr. Ardrey doesn't solve the problem. But the contribution he has made in the last act is a clear and perceptive statement of this nameless, formless situation and an estimation of what it is doing to America. ... Mr. Ardrey ... is a man of principle and taste. In Sing Me No Lullaby he has performed the function of a writer. He has found the words to describe something that is vague and elusive but ominous. And he has got far enough away from political recriminations to state it in terms of character and the life of the spirit.

In a later New York Times review, Atkinson wrote that "After the triviality of a theatre that normally aims low and is satisfied with technical competence, it is heartening to see a play that is as adult, if not more adult, than the world outside the theatre."

== Production ==
Sing Me No Lullaby opened on October 14, 1954, at the Phoenix Theatre in the West End of London. It was the inaugural play of the Phoenix Theatre's second season. The production was directed by Paul Stewart and starred Beatrice Straight, Richard Kiley, Jack Warden, Larry Gates, Michael Lipton, Marian Winters, Jessie Royce Landis, John Fiedler, and John Marley.

Sing Me No Lullaby is one of the two plays by Ardrey still made available for production by the Dramatists Play Service. The other is his most famous play, Thunder Rock.
