= Thunder Rock (film) =

1942 film

- Directed by: Roy Boulting
- Written by: Bernard Miles; Jeffrey Dell
- Based on: Thunder Rock by Robert Ardrey
- Produced by: John Boulting
- Starring: Michael Redgrave; Barbara Mullen; James Mason; Lilli Palmer
- Cinematography: Mutz Greenbaum
- Edited by: Roy Boulting
- Music by: Hans May
- Production company: Charter Film Productions
- Distributed by: Metro-Goldwyn-Mayer (UK); English Films (US)
- Release date: 4 December 1942
- Running time: 112 minutes
- Country: United Kingdom
- Language: English

Thunder Rock is a 1942 British drama film directed by Roy Boulting and starring Michael Redgrave and Barbara Mullen, with James Mason and Lilli Palmer in supporting roles. It was based on Robert Ardrey's 1939 play Thunder Rock.

== Plot ==
During the late 1930s, David Charleston is an ambitious campaigning newspaper journalist, a fierce opponent of fascism and the British policy of appeasement. He wishes to alert his readers to the dangers of German rearmament and the folly of ignoring what is going on in Europe, but the reports he submits are censored by the editor of his newspaper. He subsequently quits his job and sets off on a speaking tour around the country under the slogan "Britain, Awake!" The lack of interest and response indicates that Britain is happy to keep slumbering. The final straw comes when Charleston is at the cinema, and the newsreel feature comes on the screen detailing the German occupation of the Sudetenland. The audience show themselves completely uninterested in the newsreel, taking the opportunity to chat among themselves or go in search of refreshments. In despair at the way his countrymen seem totally oblivious to the ever-more impending doom which is about to engulf them, and appear to be content to go about their daily business as normal while all the time sleepwalking towards disaster, he decides to turn his back on Britain and find a far-flung location where he can withdraw from the world and all its contemporary woes.

He crosses the Atlantic, and finds exactly what he is looking for when he lands a job as a lone lighthouse-keeper on Lake Michigan, which will provide him with the solitude he craves. The lighthouse rock carries a commemorative tablet, listing the names of a group of immigrants from Europe who perished 90 years earlier when the ship carrying them to a new life in America foundered off-shore in a storm. As weeks turn into months in his self-imposed isolation, Charleston becomes fixated on the names on the tablet, and begins to experience ghostly visions of the lost souls, who start to relate to him their sad stories of sorrow, escape and unfulfilled dreams, in what seems an uncanny parallel to Charleston's situation. The ship's captain, Stuart, who appears to be the only ghost aware that he is dead and that it is no longer 1850, acts as mediator between Charleston and the other spirits as they tell their tales. Charleston discovers the story of proto-feminist Ellen, repeatedly persecuted and imprisoned for her progressive views, and becomes particularly emotionally involved with the Kurtz family, progressive medical man Stefan and his sad daughter Melanie, who seems to harbour a strange ghostly attraction towards Charleston, which he reciprocates.

Charleston's lonely existence is broken by the arrival of an old colleague Streeter, who is worried about him after finding out from Charleston's employers that his pay cheques have not been cashed for many months. Streeter is nonplussed and not a little concerned as he starts to realise Charleston's mental state. Stuart meanwhile becomes exasperated by the way in which Charleston's imagination is forcing the others into unrealistic behaviour. Charleston agrees to let them have more freedom of action, but then finds them all starting to question where they are and what time they are in. He finally allows Melanie to read the tablet describing their deaths, and tells them all that the civilisation they knew is coming to an imminent end, and he has withdrawn to avoid being witness to its demise. He adds that now he has told them the truth, as figments of his imagination they no longer need to appear to him.

To his consternation, they do not disappear. Stefan confronts him sternly, pointing out that running away is cowardly and that it is always better to stand up and fight for what is good and right, regardless of the consequences. None of the spirits have any intention of leaving him until he faces up to what he has to do. Finally convinced, Charleston realises he must return to Europe and carry on his fight for truth and justice against the evil which threatens the continent.

== Cast ==
- Michael Redgrave as David Charleston
- James Mason as Streeter
- Lilli Palmer as Melanie Kurtz
- Barbara Mullen as Ellen Kirby
- Finlay Currie as Capt. Joshua Stuart
- Frederick Valk as Dr. Stefan Kurtz
- Sybille Binder as Anne-Marie Kurtz
- Barry Morse as Robert
- George Carney as Harry
- Frederick Cooper as Ted Briggs
- Jean Shepherd as Millie Briggs
- Miles Malleson as Chairman of Directors
- A. E. Matthews as Mr. Kirby
- James Pirrie as Jim Sales
- Olive Sloane as Woman Director
- Tommy Duggan as Office Clerk
- Tony Quinn as Office Clerk
- Harold Anstruther as British Consul
- Alfred Sangster as Director
- Victor Beaumont as Hans (uncredited)
- Gerard Heinz as Hans Harma (uncredited)
- Milo Sperber as Hirohiti (uncredited)

== Background ==
The film is based on the 1939 play Thunder Rock by Robert Ardrey, which had originally been a flop when staged in New York folding within three weeks, but proved to be considerably more successful in London where it ran for months in the West End. The film version was opened out considerably from the source text by the addition of a montage sequence to illustrate the protagonist Charleston's back-story, and flashback sequences detailing character histories in Charleston's imagination, in the process serving to give a heightened propagandist tone to the material.

Critical opinion of the time in Britain was divided as to whether the additional material brought new depths to the story, or made too explicit things which Ardrey had preferred to leave to the audience's imagination and intelligence. The film was, however, almost universally admired by North American critics and became a success at the box-office. It ran to packed houses in New York for over three months, where the play had folded in less than three weeks.

== Production ==
In 1941, the Boulting brothers signed a contract whereby their production company, Charter Films, would produce the film for MGM, who would fund the production. Roy Boulting was to direct and John Boulting produce. Jeffrey Dell and Bernard Miles (himself a member of the original cast) adapted the screenplay. Several of the stage actors reprised their roles, including Michael Redgrave as Charleston, Frederick Valk as Dr. Kurtz, and Barbara Mullen (a later addition to the cast) as Miss Kirby. James Mason and Lilli Palmer signed on to play the parts of Streeter and Melanie respectively.

The Boulting brothers, both of whom were then engaged in the armed services, were given a special release to continue on the project. The British government arranged to have Michael Redgrave flown back from an aircraft carrier in the Far East for filming. The company spent ten weeks shooting in the Denham Film Studios. Thunder Rock was premiered in London in December 1942 and went into more general release in February 1943. The film was reissued in 1947.

== Reception ==
On its British release in 1942, Thunder Rock received mixed reviews, with critics eager to compare the screen version to the stage play, not always to the former's advantage. The Glasgow Herald review was typical, almost appearing to damn the film with faint praise by stating: "Though scarcely so good as the play, the film is by no means ineffective or undistinguished. Michael Redgrave, Barbara Mullen and others do well." The reviewer for The Manchester Guardian had also seen both, though not to the detriment of his regard for the film: "Robert Ardrey's Thunder Rock, still the best new play of the war, has been faithfully translated to the screen. ... The result is a really intelligent film, more moving in parts than anything this country's studios have produced before and more interesting technically than anything since Citizen Kane." Of the reviews that examined the film in its own right, C. A. Lejeune wrote in her long enthusiastic review for The Observer: "I like the unselfconscious courage of a film that knows what it should do and goes ahead and does it. I like a piece that doesn't give a hang whether it's popular or unpopular. I like its frank speech, so distinct from that mumbo jumbo of the average refined, pie-faced British picture."

When released in North America almost two years later, however, the film was lavished with enthusiastic praise from influential sources. In his syndicated column, Walter Winchell called the film "a glowing fantasy that lights up the dark corners of many current issues...it manages to be high-class without being highbrow". Dorothy Kilgallen, writing in her Voice of Broadway column, urged any of her out-of-town readers planning a visit to New York to "drop in at the World Theatre...and see the film Thunder Rock...you'll remember it a long time, and it may not play your town." Herbert Whittaker, film critic for the Montreal Gazette, chose the film as one of the ten best of 1944, observing "it translate(s) Robert Ardrey's deep and philosophical drama to the screen with brilliance". The Los Angeles Times described it as "highly imaginative", "noteworthy" and "outstanding".

Modern critical assessments of Thunder Rock tend to be equally assertive of the film's lasting merit. A reviewer for the Radio Times comments that the film "succeeds in creating an atmosphere that is at once haunting, mournful and inspiring. As the writer disillusioned by the world's complacent response to fascism, Michael Redgrave gives one of his most complex and tormented performances, as he regains the crusading spirit from his encounters with the victims of a shipwreck that occurred years before on the rocks near the lighthouse he now tends. With a bullish contribution from James Mason and truly touching support from ghostly emigrée Lilli Palmer, this is one of the Boulting Brothers' finest achievements." The Time Out Film Guide says: "The film effortlessly transcends its theatrical origins, merging drama and reality, past and present, propaganda and psychological insight, to complex and intelligent effect. Beautifully performed, closer in tone and style to Powell and Pressburger than to the British mainstream, it's weird and unusually gripping". In Beacons in the Dark, film historian Robyn Ludwig critiques the film as a "didactic... parable of the evils of appeasement".
