= Helmut Karl Buechner =

American ecologist and zoologist

- Born: 1918
- Died: 1975 (aged 56–57)
- Education: New York State College of Forestry; Syracuse University; Texas A&M College; Oklahoma A&M College
- Scientific career
- Fields: Ecology; Zoology
- Workplaces: Washington State College; Office of Environmental Sciences; National Zoological Park

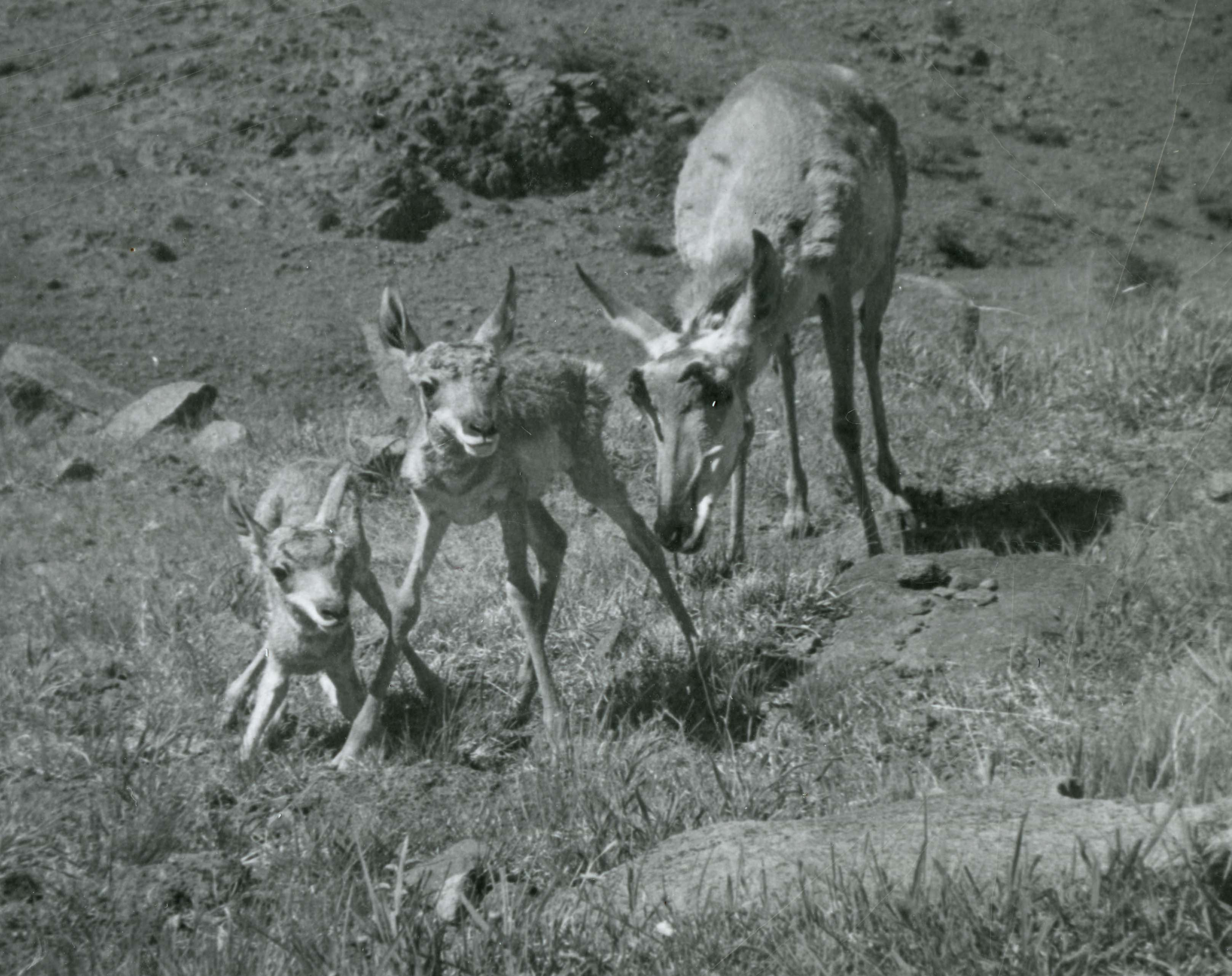
Pronghorn doe with fawns about 1 hour old, near Ft. Davis, Texas, 1947. Photo by Helmut Buechner, courtesy Smithsonian Institution.

Helmut Karl Buechner (1918–1975) was an American ecologist and zoologist.

== Biography ==
Buechner was born in 1918, in Scotia, New York. He received a bachelor's degree from New York State College of Forestry and Syracuse University in 1941. He then received a master's degree from Texas A&M College in 1943, and in 1949 got his Ph.D. from Oklahoma A&M College. From 1948 to 1965 he taught botany and zoology at Washington State College. In 1965 he became a member of the Smithsonian as its first director of the office of ecology. For 3 years (1969–1972), he was a Senior Ecologist for the Office of Environmental Sciences, and for 3 more years (1972–1975), for the National Zoological Park. He died in Washington, D.C., on October 7, 1975.

Buechner's analysis of the territorial behavior of the Ugandan kob, first observed by his wife Jimmie H. Buechner, was widely discussed by other wildlife biologists and ecologists and attracted the attention of popular authors such as Robert Ardrey.

In 1950 Buechner won the George Mercer Award of the Ecological Society of America, for his famous study "Life History, Ecology, and Range Use of the Pronghorn in Trans-Pecos Texas". He also received The Wildlife Society's Terrestrial Research Award for his work with bighorn sheep. Twice Helmut Buechner was awarded Fulbright Program appointments as Senior Scholar on Wildlife Research in Uganda, from 1956 to 1958.
