= Sidney Howard Memorial Award =

Theater prize established by the Playwrights' Company

The Sidney Howard Memorial Award was a notable but short-lived theater prize established in 1939 by the Playwrights' Company. It was designed to support new playwrights who had no notable successes but had shown promise. Among the awardees are Robert Ardrey and Tennessee Williams.

== Sidney Howard ==
Sidney Howard (1891–1939) was an American playwright and screenwriter.

He received the Pulitzer Prize for Drama in 1925 for his play They Knew What They Wanted, which was later adapted for the screen by the first Memorial Award winner, Robert Ardrey. In 1932 he was nominated for an Academy Award for his adaptation of the Sinclair Lewis novel Arrowsmith, and he was nominated again in 1936 for Dodsworth, which he had adapted for the stage in 1934. In 1940 he was awarded a posthumous Academy Award for the screenplay for Gone with the Wind. During his career he wrote or adapted over seventy plays and eleven films.

Sidney Howard was one of the founding members of the Playwrights' Company.

Howard died in 1939 at the age of forty-eight. He was working on his farm in Massachusetts when he was accidentally crushed to death by a tractor. Books Atkinson called the event "A Broadway calamity." Following his tragic death his colleagues from the Playwrights' Company established the prize in his memory.

== The Award ==
Literary Prizes and their Winners gives the following description of the prize:

In 1939 the five directors of the Playwrights' Company, Maxwell Anderson, S. N. Behrman, Elmer Rice, Robert E. Sherwood, and John F. Wharton, established the Sidney Howard Memorial Award of $1500. The prize ... is given annually to a new American playwright who, with no previous noteworthy success in the theater, has shown talent through the production of one or more of his plays in New York. The award is not designed to honor the "best play of the season," but to give support to a promising playwright."

The inaugural prize was awarded to Robert Ardrey for his play Thunder Rock, which had floundered on Broadway but went on to be an international classic.

== Awardees ==
Year	Work	Author	Publisher
1940	Thunder Rock	Robert Ardrey	Dramatists
1945	The Glass Menagerie	Tennessee Williams	Random
1946	Born Yesterday	Garson Kanin	Viking
1946	Home of the Brave	Arthur Laurents	Random
