= Shadow of Heroes =

1961 film by William Sterling

- Original Playbill from the London production
- Written by: Robert Ardrey
- Original language: English
- Subject: Hungarian Revolution of 1956, Post-war Communist Hungary
- Genre: Drama
- Setting: Hungary

Premiere
- Date premiered: 7 October 1958
- Place premiered: Piccadilly Theatre, London

Shadow of Heroes, a play in five acts from the Hungarian Passion is a 1958 documentary drama by Robert Ardrey. It concerns the lead-up to the Hungarian Uprising and its aftermath. Its premiere resulted in the release from Soviet custody of two political prisoners, Julia Rajk and her son.

== Production ==
Shadow of Heroes was first produced at the Piccadilly Theatre in London on 7 October 1958. It starred Dame Peggy Ashcroft, and was notable in giving a non-romantic leading role to a woman. The play was subsequently produced in New York and Germany.

Shadow of Heroes was broadcast to acclaim on television by the BBC program Sunday Night Theatre on 19 July 1959. The BBC production starred Dame Peggy Ashcroft and Eric Porter, with production by Michael Barry. A television adaptation was made in Australia in 1961.

== Synopsis ==
The first act opens in 1944 and follows two members of the anti-Nazi Hungarian Resistance, László Rajk and his wife Julia. They are captured and tortured. At the end of the act, as World War II draws to a close, they are sent on a death march to Belsen concentration camp.

In the second act it is 1949 and Rajk has become minister of the interior in the post-war Communist Hungarian government. He enters into a conflict with his colleagues over his refusal to accept the luxurious living quarters afforded to other high-ranking government officials; they feel his refusal makes them look bad. Rajk ends up consenting to the living quarters (after his wife gives birth), but is arrested anyway. Three days later his wife is also arrested.

The third act takes place six weeks later. Rajk has resisted all attempts to get him to sign a false confession. He is visited by his close friend, János Kádár, who has succeeded him as Minister of Information. Kádár convinces Rajk that if he assents he will be able to live with his wife and child in the Soviet Union. Rajk signs the false confession and is hanged.

In the fourth act Kádár confesses to Julia, recently released from prison, that he betrayed Rajk, "for the good of the party." Following Khrushchev's denunciation of Stalin at the 20th Congress Hungary decides to rehabilitate Rajk. Julia insists he have a public state funeral, which the Hungarian government assents to, though they decide not to publicize the event. Nonetheless over 250,000 people attend, triggering the events that lead to the uprising.

Though under the newly installed government of Imre Nagy Julia is safe, friends warn her that she will be targeted by the Soviet response. Kádár, installed by the Soviets, succeeds Nagy, and Julia takes refuge in the Yugoslav embassy. Kádár promises the refugees amnesty. They are convinced, and leave the embassy, whereupon they are all arrested. The play closes with the announcement that Julia is still a prisoner of the Russians.

== Reception and impact ==
The play received widespread critical praise, but failed to find success with audiences. However it had a significant political impact, resulting in the release from prison of Julia Rajk and her son, only 11 days after the London premiere.

The reviewer for The Age wrote "This is one of those rare pieces of theatre which commends itself ... for what it has to say and teach, and for the honesty which it says it ... [It] is a bold, challenging and moving drama which strikes hard at the human conscience."

Howard Taubman of The New York Times wrote "In Shadow of Heroes Robert Ardrey has recalled one of the shameful horror stories of our time. Because he has done so with control, his anger burns all the more compellingly. Because he has made an intensive study of the history of self-serving men who dominated Hungary and abused its people after the war, he has composed a work that is more like a sworn affidavit than a conventional play."

The play is often cited as an early example of Verbatim theatre. Writing about the style, Kenneth Tynan, reviewing for The Observer, wrote "What gives the play its power is its use of drama as a living newspaper; the idea is old and neglected, and it was thrilling to see it revived.... Mr. Ardrey, though he never entered Hungary, conducts us through the shifting sands of this desperate epoch with the assurance of a native guide."

== 1961 Australian television version ==
Shadow of Heroes
- Written by: William Sterling
- Country of origin: Australia
- Original language: English

Production
- Running time: 90 mins
- Production company: ABC

Original release
- Release: 15 June 1960 (Melbourne, live)

Shadow of Heroes was adapted for Australian TV in 1960.

It was made at a time when Australian TV drama was rare.

Don Crosby appeared with his son Michael.

=== Cast ===
- June Brunell as Julia Rajk
- Wynn Roberts as Laszlo Rajk
- Don Crosby as Janos Kadar
- Campbell Copelin as Imre Nagy
- Peter Aenensen as Rakosi
- Robert Peach as Gero
- Edward Howell as Viktor Babbits

=== Reception ===
The TV critic from The Sydney Morning Herald thought that producer William Sterling "managed to give the action (much of it dialogue) gripping provision; yet his insertion of newsreel film clips jarred slightly against the fine acting."

The Age said it was "outstanding".
