= Herman Shumlin =

American theatre director and producer (1898–1979)

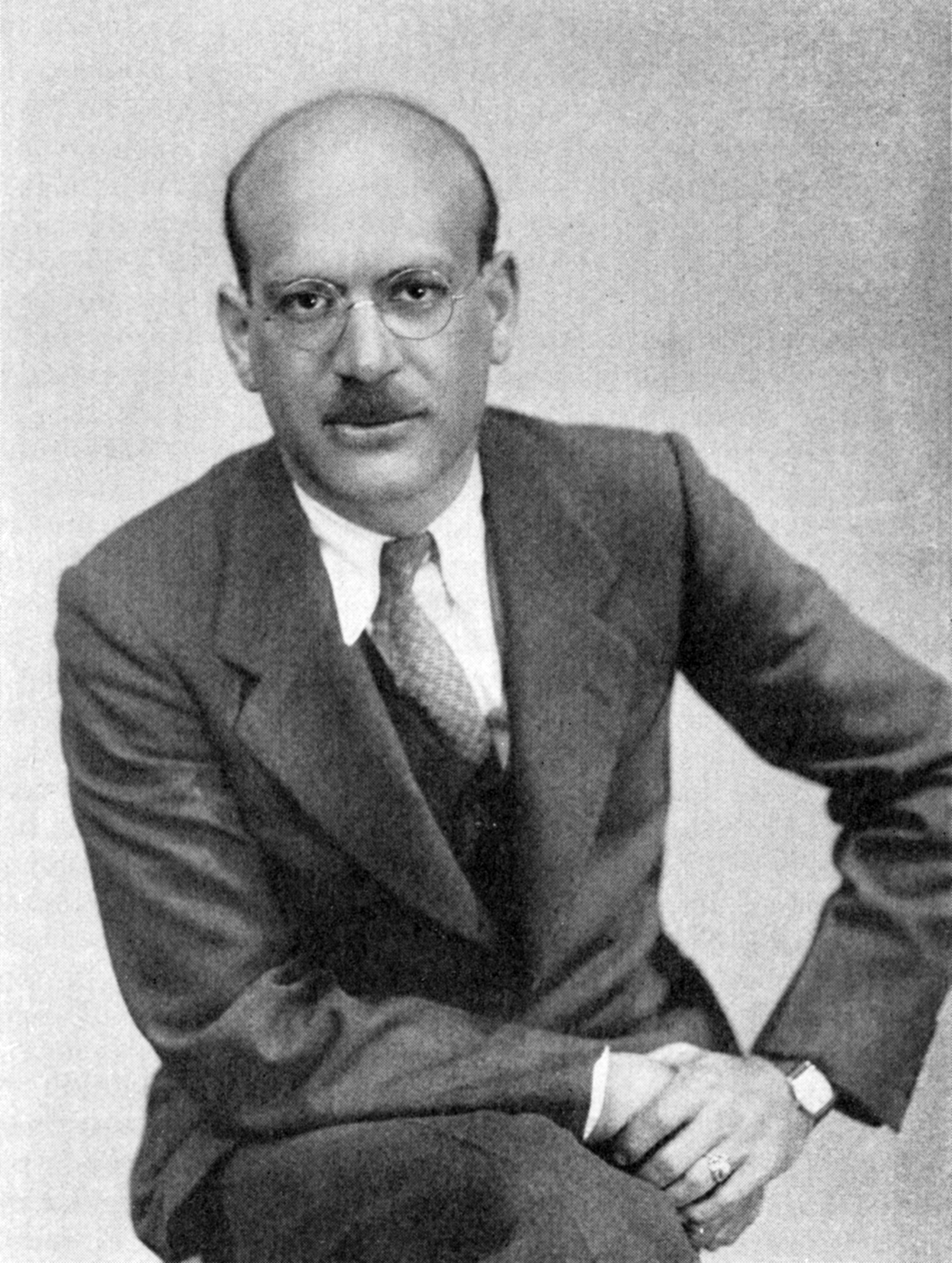
- Herman Shumlin in 1931
- Born: December 6, 1898; Atwood, Colorado
- Died: June 4, 1979 (aged 80); New York City, New York
- Occupations: Theatrical producer, director

Herman Shumlin (December 6, 1898, Atwood, Colorado – June 4, 1979, New York City) was a prolific Broadway theatrical director and theatrical producer, beginning in 1927 with the play Celebrity and continuing through 1974 with a short run of As You Like It, notably with an all-male cast. He also directed two movies, including Watch on the Rhine (1943), which he had first directed and produced on Broadway in 1941.

During a Broadway career lasting 47 years, he was the director, producer, or both, of 45 productions, including three separate productions of The Corn Is Green (1940, 1943, and 1950). Other productions include The Little Foxes (1939), Watch on the Rhine (1941), and Inherit the Wind (1955). Inherit the Wind ran for 806 performances, and was made into a movie in 1960 starring Spencer Tracy, Fredric March, and Gene Kelly, and has been remade three times since, in 1965, 1988, and 1999.

Shumlin taught directing in the Theater Department of The City College of New York in the 1960s and 1970s. As well as Watch on the Rhine, he directed the movie Confidential Agent (1945).

== Theatre credits ==
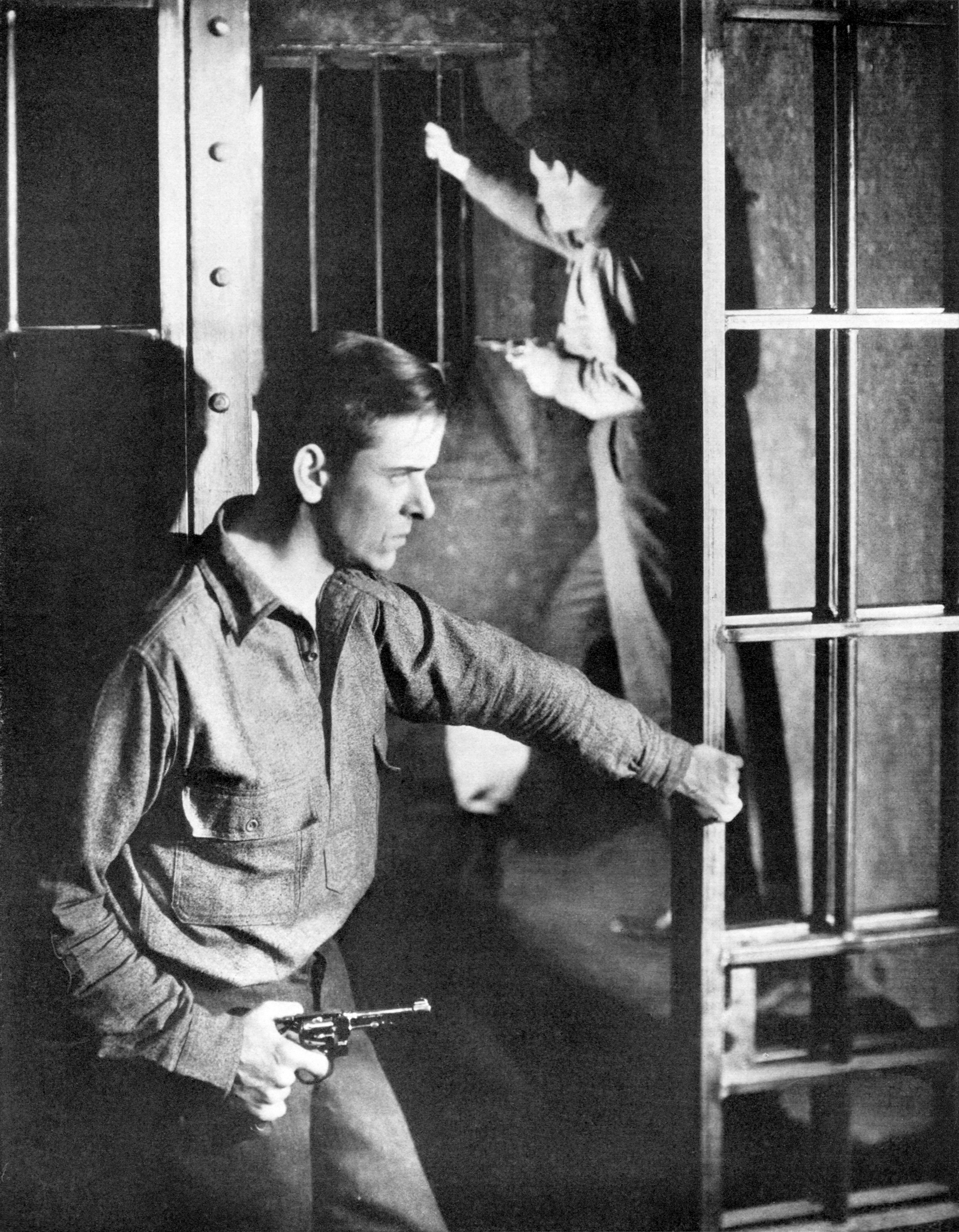
Howard Phillips and Spencer Tracy in The Last Mile (1930)

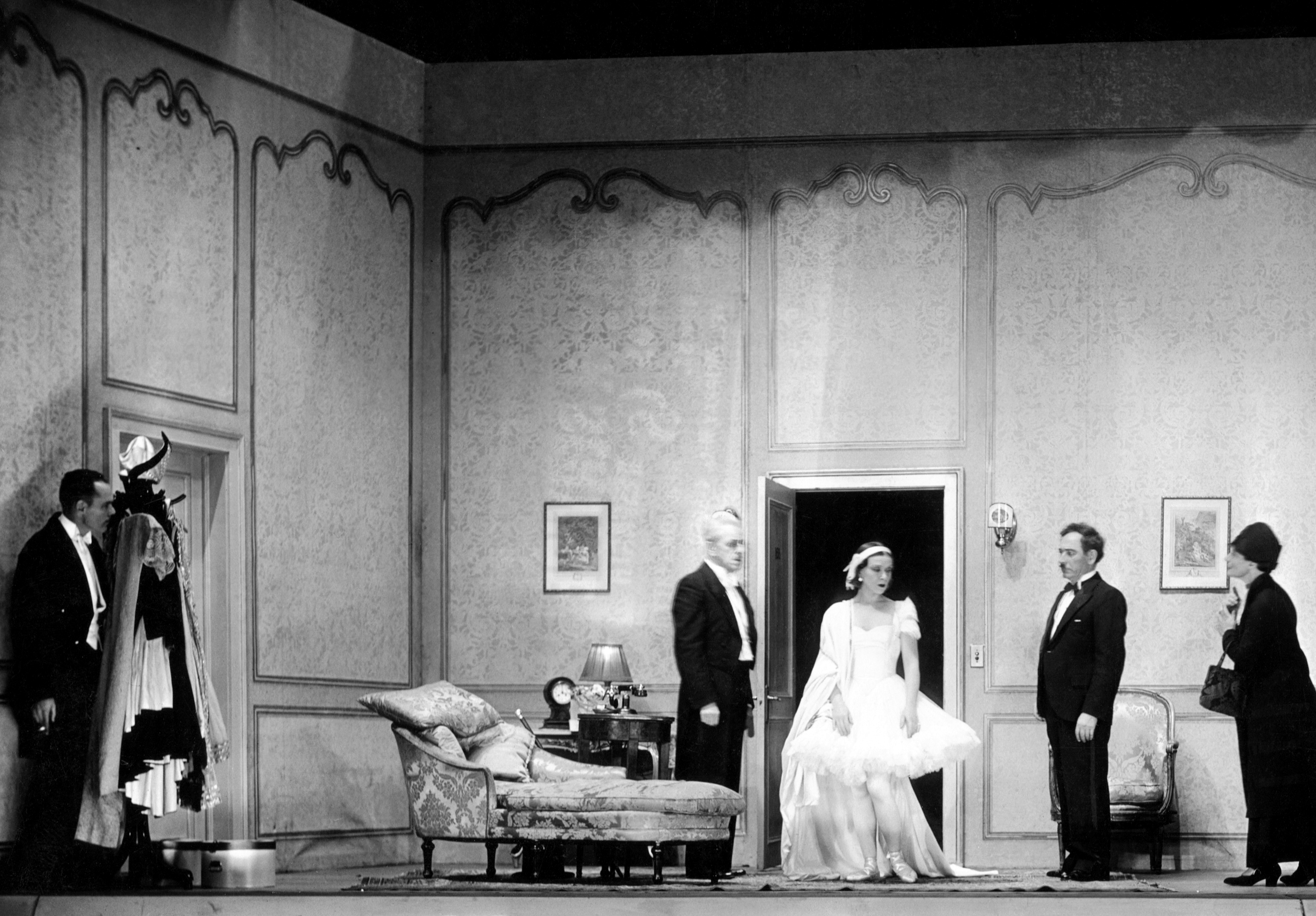
Henry Hull, William Nunn, Eugenie Leontovich, Lester Alden and Rafaela Ottiano in Grand Hotel (1930)

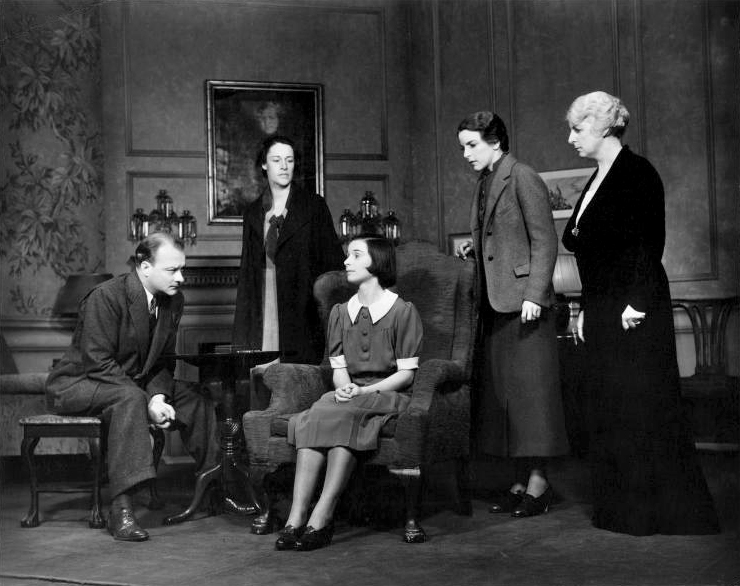
Robert Keith, Anne Revere, Florence McGee, Katherine Emery and Katherine Emmet in The Children's Hour (1934)

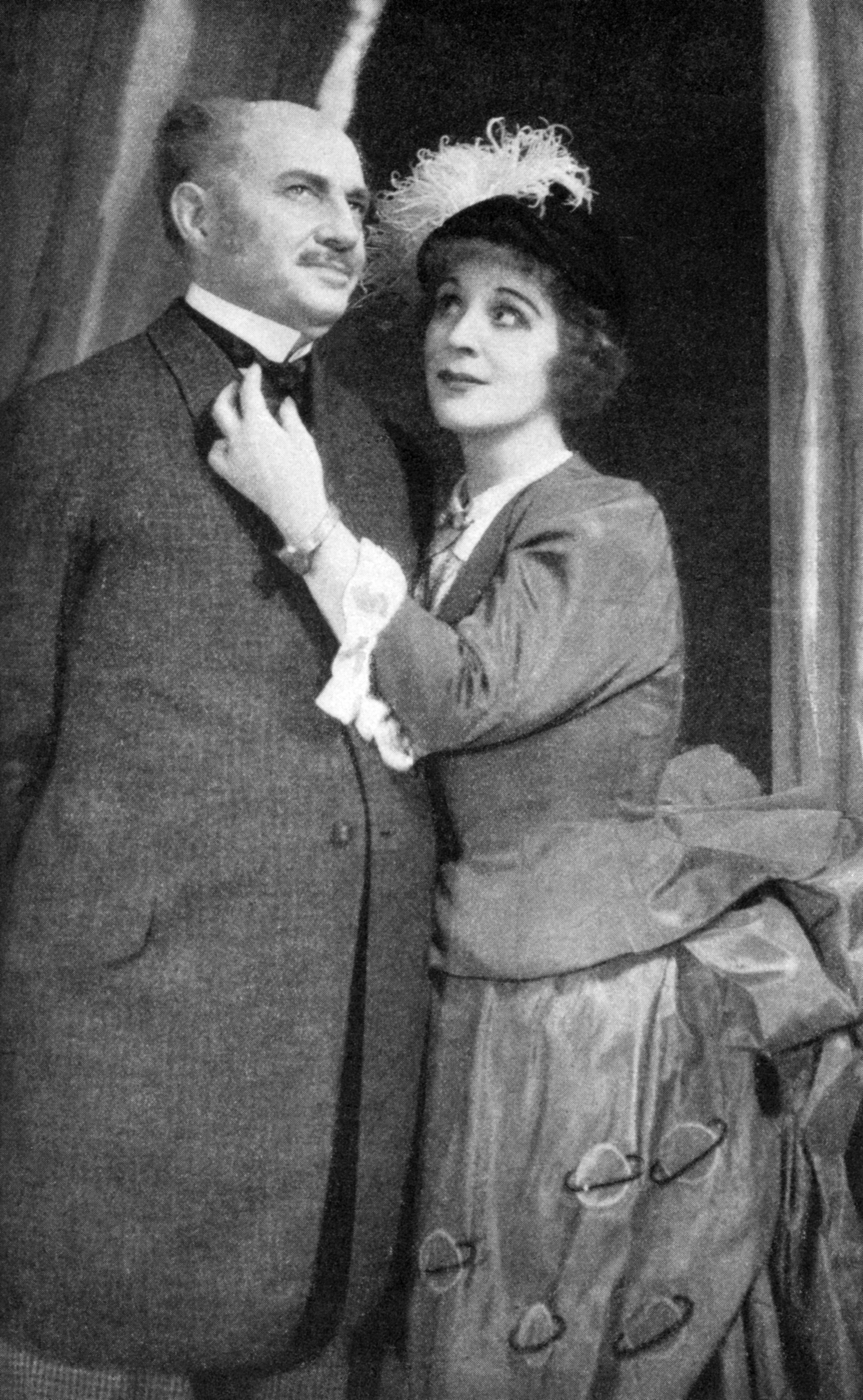
Percy Waram and Jane Cowl in Thornton Wilder's The Merchant of Yonkers (1938)

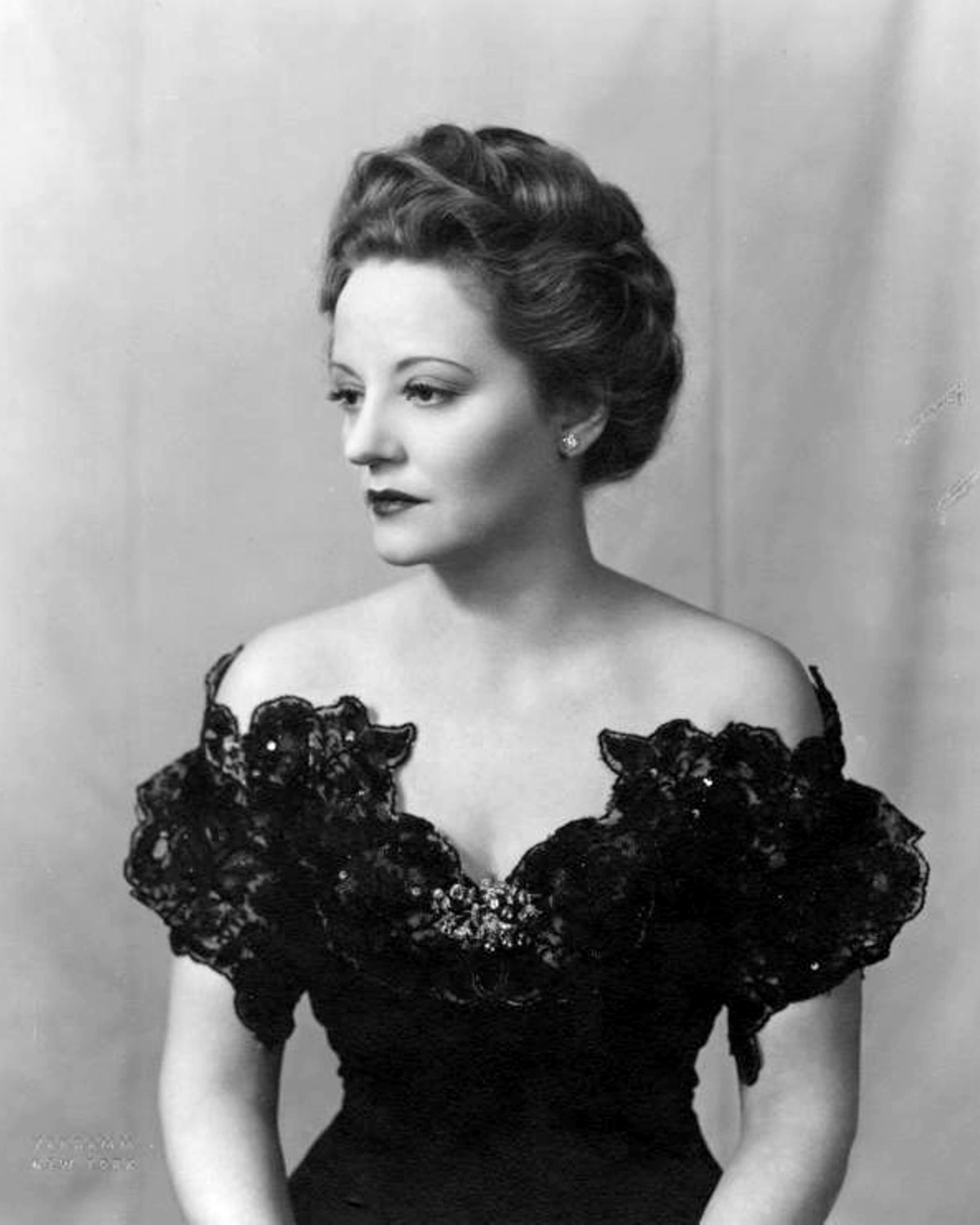
Tallulah Bankhead as Regina Giddens in The Little Foxes (1939)

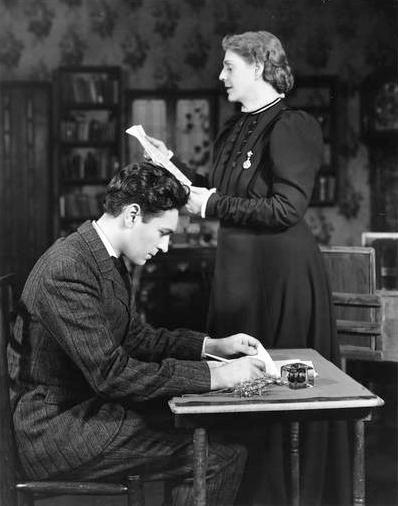
Richard Waring and Ethel Barrymore in the Broadway production of The Corn Is Green (1940)

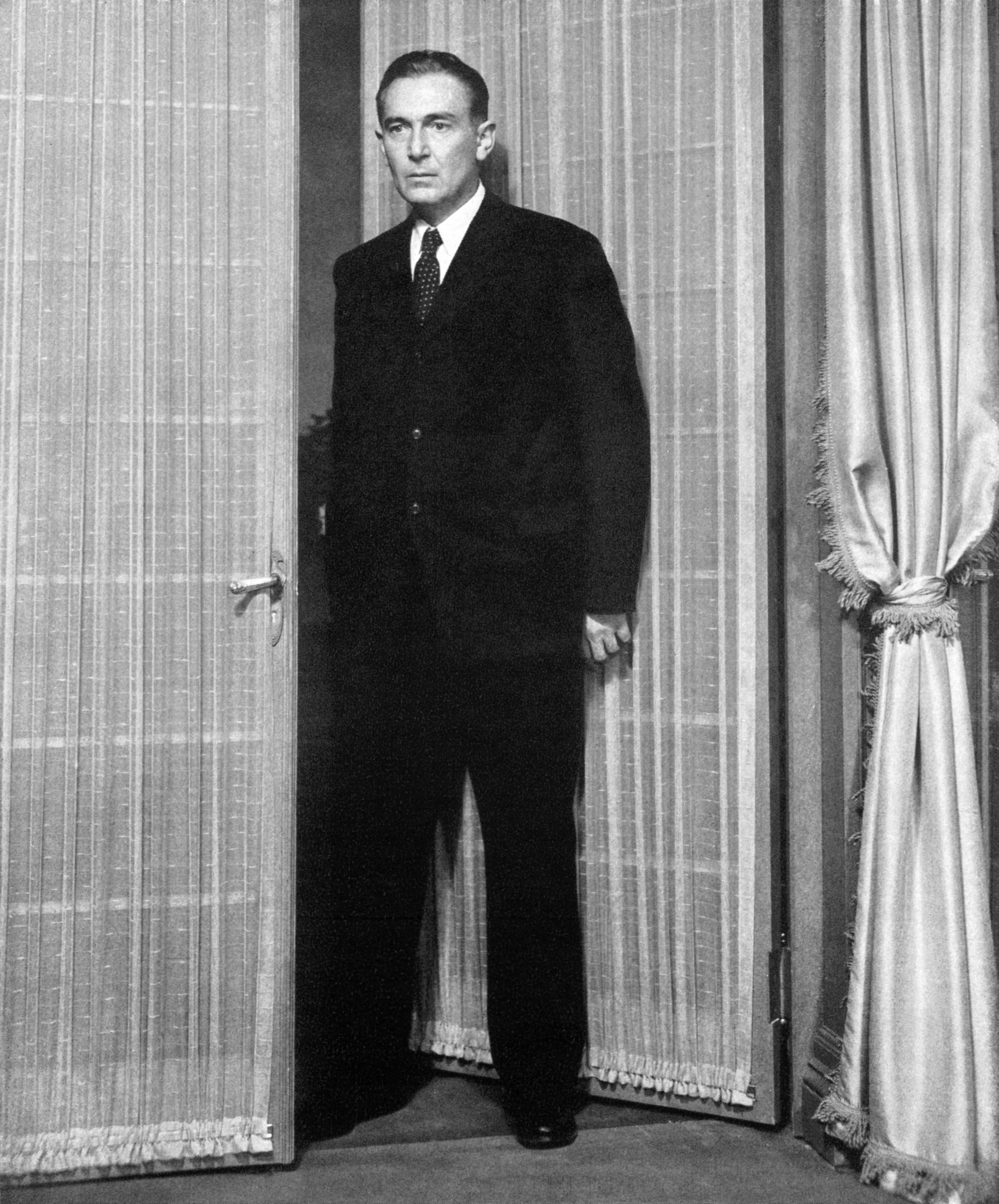
Paul Lukas as Kurt Mueller in Watch on the Rhine (1941)

Date	Title	Venue	Notes
December 26, 1927 – January 1928	Celebrity	Lyceum Theatre, New York City	Producer
October 3 – October 1928	The Command Performance	Klaw Theatre, New York City	Producer
November 13, 1928 – January 1929	To-Night at 12	Hudson Theatre, New York City	Producer
October 23, 1929 – October 1929	Button, Button	Bijou Theatre, New York City	Producer
February 13 – October 1930	The Last Mile	Sam H. Harris Theatre, New York City	Producer
November 13, 1930 – December 1931	Grand Hotel	National Theatre, New York City	Producer, director
September 14 – December 3, 1932	Clear All Wires	Times Square Theatre, New York City	Producer, director
October 17, 1933 – January 1934	Ten Minute Alibi	Ethel Barrymore Theatre, New York City	Director
September 13 – September 1934	The Bride of Torozko	Henry Miller's Theatre, New York City	Producer, director
November 20, 1934 – July 1936	The Children's Hour	Maxine Elliott Theatre, New York City	Producer, director
October 11 – October 1935	Sweet Mystery of Life	Shubert Theatre, New York City	Producer, director
December 15 – December 1936	Days to Come	Vanderbilt Theatre, New York City	Producer, director
February 21 – March 1938	Wine of Choice	Guild Theatre, New York City	Director
December 28, 1938 – January 1939	The Merchant of Yonkers	Guild Theatre, New York City	Producer
February 15, 1939 – February 1940	The Little Foxes	National Theatre, New York City	Producer, director
January 9 – August 3, 1940	The Male Animal	Cort Theatre, New York City	Producer, director
November 26, 1940 – January 17, 1942	The Corn Is Green	National Theatre, New York City	Producer, director
April 1, 1941 – February 21, 1942	Watch on the Rhine	Martin Beck Theatre, New York City	Producer, director
November 26 – December 19, 1942	The Great Big Doorstep	Morosco Theatre, New York City	Producer, director
May 3 – June 19, 1943	The Corn Is Green	Martin Beck Theatre, New York City	Producer, director
April 12, 1944 – January 20, 1945	The Searching Wind	Fulton Theatre, New York City	Producer, director
October 17 – November 4, 1944	The Visitor	Henry Miller's Theatre, New York City	Producer, director
March 20 – June 23, 1945	Kiss Them for Me	Belasco Theatre and Fulton Theatre, New York City	Director
February 21–28, 1946	Jeb	Martin Beck Theatre, New York City	Producer, director, production supervisor
March 30 – April 9, 1949	The Biggest Thief in Town	Mansfield Theatre, New York City	Director
January 11–22, 1950	The Corn Is Green	New York City Center, New York City	Volunteer consultant
September 18 – November 4, 1950	Daphne Laureola	Music Box Theatre, New York City	Producer
February 20 – March 10, 1951	The High Ground	48th Street Theatre, New York City	Director
September 4 – November 10, 1951	Lace on Her Petticoat	Booth Theatre, New York City	Producer, director
November 19–24, 1951	To Dorothy, A Son	John Golden Theatre, New York City	Producer, director
January 30 – February 2, 1952	Gertie	Plymouth Theatre, New York City	Producer, director
April 22 – May 17, 1952	Candida	National Theatre, New York City	Director
October 13 – November 1, 1952	The Gambler	Lyceum Theatre, New York City	Director
November 20, 1954 – February 26, 1955	Wedding Breakfast	48th Street Theatre, New York City	Director
April 21, 1955 – June 22, 1957	Inherit the Wind	National Theatre, New York City	Producer, director
January 29 – May 2, 1959	Tall Story	Belasco Theatre, New York City	Director
November 19 – December 12, 1959	Only in America	Cort Theatre, New York City	Producer, director
December 1–17, 1960	Little Moon of Alban	Longacre Theatre, New York City	Director
March 2 – July 10, 1963	Dear Me, The Sky is Falling	Music Box Theatre, New York City	Director
September 24, 1963	Bicycle Ride to Nevada	Cort Theatre, New York City	Producer, director
February 26 – November 28, 1964	The Deputy	Brooks Atkinson Theatre, New York City	Producer, director
December 14, 1967 – June 8, 1968	Spofford	ANTA Playhouse, New York City	Playwright, director
May 1–18, 1968	Soldiers	Billy Rose Theatre, New York City	Producer
October 7–26, 1974	Flowers	Biltmore Theatre, New York City	Producer
December 3–8, 1974	As You Like It	Mark Hellinger Theatre, New York City	Producer
