= Jeb (play) =

- Playbill from the original Broadway production
- Written by: Robert Ardrey
- Original language: English
- Subject: post-World War II race relations in America
- Genre: Drama

Premiere
- Place premiered: Martin Beck Theatre

Jeb was a play by Robert Ardrey that opened on Broadway in February 1946 tackling the issue of race in post-World War II America. The play deals with a disabled black veteran who returns to his home in the rural South after serving overseas.

Despite excellent reviews and an extremely positive critical reception, the play closed after a very short run, leading several commentators to assert that it was ahead of its time.

== Synopsis ==
The playwright, Robert Ardrey, gave the following synopsis of Jeb:

The story had been haunting me. It concerned a black soldier whom I named Jeb, who returned from the Pacific war with an aluminum leg. The loss of the leg disturbed him not at all, for to his pride he had acquired a skill in the army: he could run an adding machine. And the story takes place when he returns to his family, to his girl, and to the small Southern town where an adding machine is a white man's job. He pursues his passionate ambition against relentless opposition, and in the end we find him in northern Harlem, physically beaten yet undefeated, prepared to return to the South in a larger cause. It was the story of the making of a militant.

== Production ==
The playwright, Robert Ardrey, was by the time of Jeb already an acclaimed screenwriter. He had also had several plays produced on Broadway. His most famous, and his first contribution to what he described as the théâtre engagé, or a "theater engaged with its times", was Thunder Rock, which also ran into difficulties because of its pioneering social theme. Ardrey would go on to be an eminent paleoantropologist.

Jeb was produced and directed by Herman Shumlin. It was one of the only Broadway plays of its time to offer major opportunities to African American actors, and had a majority-black cast. It starred Ossie Davis (who would go on to be one of the most acclaimed African American actors of his generation and a favorite of Spike Lee), along with his eventual wife, Ruby Dee (who went on to co-star in A Raisin in the Sun), as well as, in the role of the child, Reri Grist.

== Reception ==
Due in part to high production costs and relatively low revenue the play closed after only seven performances. However, Jeb garnered widespread critical praise. The reviewer for Billboard wrote, “Robert Ardrey has scripted a drama that has the guts and the power to make you angry… Jeb is absorbing from curtain to curtain.” George Jean Nathan called it "A more dynamic play than any recent exhibit dealing with the Negro’s difficulties in a country dominated by whites." And Howard Barnes, reviewing for the New York Herald Tribune, wrote "A play which I would not have missed… Drama of high eloquence and indignation… Robert Ardrey has considered the subject squarely and savagely."

The play's Broadway failure despite its acknowledged merit led several commentators to opine that it was ahead of its time. Albert Wertheim, in his 2004 study, wrote:

Indeed, Jeb shows how the participation of African Americans in World War II and the occupational training they received in the armed forces prepare them in the postwar period to dress for battle in a new war to end racial discrimination and oppression at home. This is heady and unsettling stuff in 1946 for Broadway audiences and for society trying to return to prewar 'normalcy' and to put returning white soldiers back into the work force. It is no small wonder that Jeb, with its incisive unveiling of racism’s economic underpinnings and with its militant ending, closed after six performances.

Ardrey himself came to share this opinion. In his autobiography he writes, "I had done it again. In 1939 I opened Thunder Rock six months too soon. In 1946 I had opened Jeb twenty years ahead of its time."
