= God and Texas =

- Original language: English
- Written by: Robert Ardrey
- Setting: The Alamo

God and Texas is a 1943 one-act play by Robert Ardrey.

God and Texas is a fiction play set during the Battle of the Alamo. In 1943 the play was one of five made available royalty free for members of the armed forces to produce with no special clearance or red tape.

God and Texas has been published in several volumes. It was printed in full in the September, 1943 issue of Theatre Arts Magazine. In 1944 it was collected in the volume The Best One-Act Plays of 1943. In 2004 it was collected, with an introduction by Glenn Young, in the volume Let Freedom Ring: 7 Patriotic Plays.
