= Robert Ardrey =

American playwright (1908–1980)

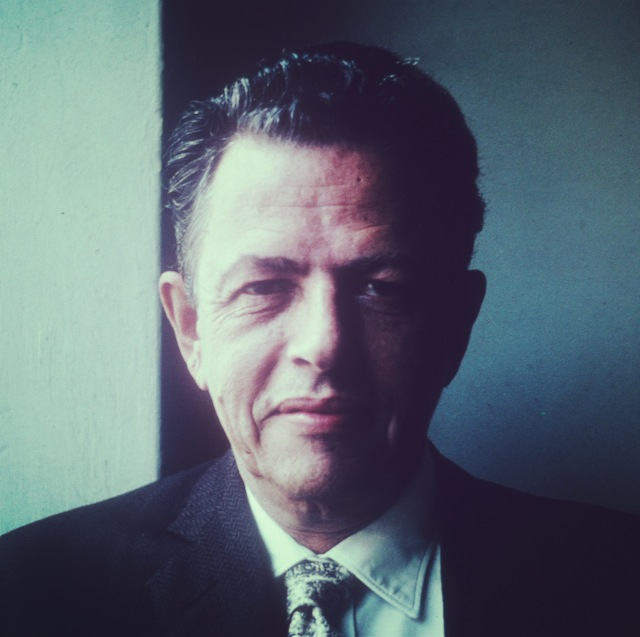
- (c.1960)
- Born: October 16, 1908; Chicago, Illinois, United States
- Died: January 14, 1980 (aged 71); Kalk Bay, South Africa
- Education: University of Chicago, Phi Beta Kappa, 1930
- Occupations: Writer, screenwriter, and playwright
- Spouses: Helen Johnson (m. 1938; div. 1960) Berdine Grünewald (m. 1960)
- Writing career
- Notable works: Thunder Rock (1939); The Three Musketeers (1948); Madame Bovary (1949); African Genesis (1961); The Territorial Imperative (1966); Khartoum (1966)
- Notable awards: Guggenheim Fellowship; Sidney Howard Memorial Award; Royal Society of Literature Fellow

Robert Ardrey (October 16, 1908 – January 14, 1980) was an American playwright, screenwriter and science writer, best known for his books African Genesis (1961) and The Territorial Imperative (1966). After a Broadway and Hollywood career, he returned to his academic training in anthropology in the 1950s.

As a playwright and screenwriter Ardrey received many accolades. He was awarded a Guggenheim Fellowship in 1937, won the inaugural Sidney Howard Memorial Award in 1940, and in 1966 received an Academy Award nomination for best screenplay for his script for Khartoum. His most famous play is Thunder Rock.

Ardrey's science writing challenged models in the social sciences of his time. African Genesis and The Territorial Imperative, two of his most widely read works, increased public awareness of evolutionary science. However he was heavily criticized by scientists for having misunderstood the science and for misinterpreting the evidence.

== Life ==
Ardrey was born in Chicago, the son of Robert Leslie Ardrey, an editor and publisher, and Marie (née Haswell). His father died in 1919 from pneumonia during the influenza epidemic and he was raised by his mother. He grew up on the South Side of Chicago and attended the nearby University of Chicago, graduating Phi Beta Kappa in 1930 as a Ph.B. While in attendance, he studied creative writing with Thornton Wilder, who would become his lifelong mentor.

His first play, Star Spangled, opened on Broadway in 1935 and lasted only a few days, but resulted in the award of a Guggenheim Fellowship. The award granted Ardrey the financial independence to focus on writing plays. Several of his subsequent plays, including Casey Jones, How to Get Tough About It, and his most famous play, Thunder Rock, were produced on Broadway.

In 1938 he moved to Hollywood to work as a screenwriter for Metro-Goldwyn-Mayer, where he would eventually become MGM's highest paid writer. There he wrote many screenplays, including those for adaptations such as The Three Musketeers (1948, with Gene Kelly), Madame Bovary (1949), The Secret Garden (1949), and The Wonderful Country (1959, with Robert Mitchum; The Wonderful Country also had a cameo from famed Negro leagues pitcher Satchel Paige). He also wrote original screenplays, including the screenplay for Khartoum (1966, directed by Basil Dearden, starring Charlton Heston and Laurence Olivier) for which he was nominated for the Academy Award for Best Writing, Story, and Screenplay.

During the 1950s Ardrey became increasingly disenchanted with Hollywood and what he saw as the growing role money had started to play in creative decisions. At the same time and largely by accident, he renewed his interest in human origins and human behavior, which he had studied at the University of Chicago. In the summer of 1956 he moved with his wife and two sons to Geneva. He spent the following years traveling in Southern and Eastern Africa, conducting research for what was to become his first book on the subject, African Genesis (1961), ultimately an international bestseller. Subsequently, he went on to write a total of four books in his widely read Nature of Man Series, including his best known book The Territorial Imperative (1966).

In October 1960 he moved with his second wife to Trastevere, Rome, where they lived for 17 years. In 1977 they moved to a small town named Kalk Bay just outside Cape Town, South Africa. He continued to publish influential works until his death on January 14, 1980, from lung cancer. His ashes, along with those of his wife, are interred in the Holy Trinity Church overlooking False Bay.

== Theater and film career ==
After graduating from the University of Chicago, under the continuing mentorship of Thornton Wilder, Ardrey wrote a novel, several plays, and many short stories, all of which remained unpublished. It was Wilder's rule that "A young author should not write for market until his style [has] 'crystallized'". Wilder and Ardrey agreed that this moment came with the writing of the play Star Spangled.

Star Spangled opened on Broadway in 1935. It was a comedy that brought to life the classic struggles of an immigrant family living on the South Side of Chicago. It received largely negative reviews and lasted only a few days. However it did catch the attention of notable playwright Sidney Howard, whom Ardrey claims was instrumental in the resulting award of a Guggenheim fellowship for promise as a young playwright. The award allowed Ardrey the financial independence to remain in Chicago and focus on writing plays.

While in Chicago Ardrey wrote two more plays. The first, Casey Jones, was a play about railroad men and their love for their machines. The second, How to Get Tough About It, Ardrey describes as "A proletarian love story of pleasant dimensions." In 1938 Guthrie McClintic presented How to Get Tough About It and Elia Kazan directed Casey Jones. The plays opened ten days apart and were massive failures. In his preface to Plays of Three Decades Ardrey writes:

No author in Broadway memory had attained two such failures on a scale quite so grand on evenings quite so close together. Had they opened six months apart, none would have noticed. Coming as they did, I became a kind of upside-down white-headed boy, a figure thundering toward literary glory in reverse gear. Hollywood, incapable of resisting the colossal, bid lavishly for my services. And Samuel Goldwyn, buyer of none but the best, bought me.

Ardrey signed a contract with Metro-Goldwyn-Mayer and moved for the first time to Hollywood to work as a screenwriter. He worked on several projects, including Samuel Goldwyn's notorious boondoggle remake of Graustark, which was cancelled, and a western called The Cowboy and the Lady, from which he was dropped (though he later used most of the plot for his smash success Lady Takes A Chance). While in Los Angeles he would meet and work with Samuel Goldwyn, Clarence Brown, Pandro Berman, Garson Kanin, Gene Fowler, Lillian Hellman, Sidney Howard, and S.N. Behrman.

In 1938, however, he received word that his Broadway agent, Harold Freedman, had sold the film rights to his play How to Get Tough About It. Ardrey decided to use the opportunity to take time off to write a play. He travelled to Tucson where he married Helen Johnson with famed Hollywood director Garson Kanin as his best man. Following his wedding, he sent a note to Samuel Goldwyn which read: "Dear Mr. Goldwyn. I fear that I am wasting your money, and I'm sure you are wasting my time." He moved with his new wife back to the east coast and set to work, first on a minor project which he would abandon, and then on the play that would become Thunder Rock.

=== Thunder Rock ===
Robert Ardrey wrote Thunder Rock during the period of escalation in Europe which would lead to World War II. Despairing of the growing isolationism among Americans, Ardrey became convinced that American involvement in the war was a moral necessity. However he did not intend to write a play about the conflict until he was struck by a moment of inspiration during a performance of Swan Lake, in which he conceived of "the play from beginning to end, complete with first, second, and third act curtains."

In his autobiography, Ardrey gives the following summary of the play:

My story was that of a renowned journalist who having experienced the disillusionments of the 1930s had given up all hope of influencing man toward a better world. In his depths, he takes a job as keeper of a lonely lighthouse on a rock in Lake Michigan. On that rock, a century earlier, had been wrecked a ship carrying immigrants to the New World. It was a time of legitimate hope – he thought. And there – within this lighthouse, symbolically the shape of his mind – he recreated a little world populated by the hopeful immigrants to the New World. The play consists of the journalist-lightkeeper and the long-dead people of his own resurrection, his relations with characters existing only in his own mind. Yet in the probing of his own creations, his integrity catches up with him. They were as much escaping problems of their world as he was of his. In the end he returns to reality.

Thunder Rock, an anti-isolationist play, opened on Broadway in November, 1939 to isolationist critics and a public wary of war. It received largely negative reviews and a poor reception. In the introduction to Plays of Three Decades, Ardrey writes that it opened "to the worst reviews I have ever received. Our most eminent critic deplored a play containing so much thunder and so little rock." Despite the negative initial reception, later commentators have described the play as prescient. Though unpopular at the time, it presaged the collapse of American isolationism. It was also one of the few pieces of art to warn not only about the European, but also about the Asian threat. Albert Wertheim remarked, "Ardrey's play is remarkable in another way as well. It is one of the only—perhaps the only—play of the period to see the conflicts and dangers across the Pacific. All other pre-Pearl Harbor plays of note look exclusively across the Atlantic to Hitler, Mussolini, and Europe."

During the summer of 1940 Ardrey discovered, when he read a syndicated column from Britain, that unbeknownst to him Thunder Rock had been having a massively successful run in London. In the column Vincent Sheehan wrote that it had become so emblematic as to be "London's Chu Chin Chow of World War II." The British rights had been sold to Herbert Marshall, who had launched a production starring Michael Redgrave. The play had been so successful that the British Minister of Information, Duff Cooper, arranged to have the Treasury department fund a production at the Globe Theatre in London's West End.

The play deeply resonated with a British public under siege. Eminent theater critic Harold Hobson wrote of Thunder Rock:

"The theatre ... did a great deal to keep the morale of the British people high. One intellectual play had an enormous effect in keeping alight a spirit of hope at a time when it was nearer to extinction than it had ever been, either before or after. This was Thunder Rock, by Robert Ardrey. What he accomplished for the British people at a moment of supreme despair ... merits their lasting gratitude. ... He, more quietly but equally effectively as Churchill, urged us never to surrender."

Following its success in London, Thunder Rock has had a lasting legacy. Later in 1940 the BBC broadcast a live radio version, and in 1946 they produced an adaption for television. In 1942, Thunder Rock was turned into a film, directed by the Boulting Brothers, also starring Michael Redgrave. (See Thunder Rock (film))

Shortly following the war, productions of Thunder Rock were quickly launched in Vienna, Prague, Budapest, and, most famously, in Allied-occupied Berlin where it was the first modern play to go up in the American zone. It continues to be commonly produced in American university theaters and productions have gone up all around the globe, including in Harare (formerly Salisbury), Zimbabwe, and Nairobi, Kenya.

=== Hollywood 1939–1946 ===
After Thunder Rock quickly closed on Broadway, Ardrey returned to Hollywood. His first official credit was the screenplay for the adaptation of Sidney Howard's Pulitzer Prize-winning play They Knew What They Wanted (1939). It was directed by Garson Kanin, starred Carole Lombard and Charles Laughton, and was shot on location in Napa Valley. In 1946, after a series of talks with RKO, Ardrey and his new agent Harold Norling Swanson negotiated the first-ever independent contract with a major Hollywood studio for him to write the screen adaptation of the A. J. Cronin novel The Green Years. The contract stipulated that Ardrey could work at his home in Brentwood – an unprecedented studio concession – and he was not to be bothered until he completed the screenplay in around six weeks. The Green Years debuted to record profits and went on to be one of the highest-grossing films of 1946.

Following these successes in Hollywood, Ardrey returned to New York to reengage the theater. There he wrote Jeb.

=== Jeb ===
Jeb was a play about a disabled African American soldier returning to his home in the rural south after having fought in the war in the Pacific. He has lost one leg, but gained the ability to run an adding machine. Seeking out employment, he is faced with the bigotry of his countrymen. Jeb opened in New York in 1946. It received largely positive reviews (famed American theatre critic George Jean Nathan called it the best play on the topic of civil rights) and found small but enthusiastic audiences. However, due to factors including high production costs and relatively low revenues, the play had to close after a run of only one week. The critical consensus, with which Ardrey came to agree, was that Jeb was far ahead of its time.

=== Hollywood 1946–1966 ===
Following the short run of Jeb Ardrey moved back to Hollywood and signed a two-picture deal with MGM. In 1946 and '47 he wrote The Secret Garden. In 1947 he wrote the screenplay for The Three Musketeers, (which would become the second-highest-grossing film of 1948.) starring Lana Turner and Gene Kelly. This became Gene Kelly's favorite non-musical role. In 1949, Ardrey wrote the screenplay for Gustave Flaubert's classic novel Madame Bovary. The film starred Jennifer Jones with James Mason playing the role of Flaubert. The novel was originally tried for obscenity in France and Ardrey used this as a device to frame the story and allow for a commentator.

In 1947, Ardrey, amid growing persecution of Hollywood by the House Un-American Activities Committee, was elected to the board of the Screen Writers Guild and made chairman of its Political Advisory Committee. Following the founding of the Committee for the First Amendment, Ardrey flew to Washington, along with Lauren Bacall, Humphrey Bogart, Gene Kelly, Danny Kaye, and John Huston, to defend The Hollywood Ten. Later, on behalf of the Guild, Ardrey worked with Thurman Arnold to lodge a suit against the Hollywood blacklist with the Supreme Court. The suit came up for review four years later, but the Guild dropped it.

In the early '50s, partly due to its enforcement of the blacklists and partly due to the increasing role banks were playing in creative decisions, Ardrey began to feel a growing dissatisfaction with Hollywood and started to travel abroad. He travelled to Paris, Madrid, Barcelona, the Riviera, Venice, Yugoslavia, where he spent a month living in Belgrade, Greece, Istanbul, and Munich. He later described these travels as "necessary exercises" for his book African Genesis.

In 1952 Ardrey joined the presidential campaign of Democratic Senator Adlai Stevenson against the Republican nominee, Dwight D. Eisenhower, as a part of the group "Hollywood for Stevenson". The group sponsored an investigator to go to the hometown of Eisenhower's running mate, Richard Nixon, for research. While there the investigator discovered, in the high school newspaper archives, that Nixon had been known as "Tricky Dick".

In 1954 Ardrey wrote a play about the persecution of accused communists in post-Cold War America. This play, Sing Me No Lullaby, was presented at the Phoenix Theatre in London. Brooks Atkinson, in his New York Times review, wrote:

"...the contribution [Ardrey] has made in the last act is a clear and perceptive statement of this nameless, formless situation and an estimation of what it is doing to America ... Mr. Ardrey ... is a man of principle and taste. In Sing Me No Lullaby he has performed the function of a writer. He has found the words to describe something that is vague and elusive but ominous. And he has got far enough away from political recriminations to state it in terms of character and the life of the spirit."

Also in 1954 Ardrey wrote the adaptation of John Masters' novel Bhowani Junction. Due in part to the intervention of the banks financing the film, Ardrey entered into contested negotiations over rewrites. Eventually he quit and took his name off the film.

In 1958 Ardrey wrote the play Shadow of Heroes about the Hungarian Uprising of 1956. The play resulted in the release from Soviet custody of two political prisoners, Julia Rajk and her son.

Ardrey next turned his attention toward Africa. He was soon to begin his pioneering work in paleoanthropology, but he also continued his career as a screenwriter. In 1964 he wrote the first screenplay adaptation of Isak Dinesen's novel Out of Africa. In 1966 he wrote another screenplay set in Africa, the Academy Award-nominated Khartoum.

=== Khartoum ===
Khartoum was written and produced in 1966, directed by Basil Dearden. The film is based on historical accounts of British Gen. Charles "Chinese" Gordon's defense of the Sudanese city of Khartoum from the forces of the Mahdist army during the Siege of Khartoum.

Khartoum starred Charlton Heston as General Gordon and Laurence Olivier as the Mahdi (Muhammad Ahmed). Heston, in his autobiography, wrote about his decision to take the role: "It's a good part, presents the challenge of doing a mystic, as well as the English thing. Also, it's a helluva good script."

The academy agreed with Heston's assessment of the script. In 1967 Khartoum earned Ardrey a nomination for the Oscar for Best Original Screenplay.

== Africa ==
In 1955, when Ardrey was considering a trip to Africa, Max Ascoli, publisher of The Reporter, offered to buy anything that Ardrey would write there. At the same time, Ardrey renewed an acquaintance with prominent geologist Richard Foster Flint. Because of Ardrey's background in geology and paleontology, Flint arranged for Ardrey to investigate claims made by Raymond Dart about a specimen of Australopithecus africanus.

Ardrey met Dart in South Africa and examined his evidence. Particularly, Dart had amassed a sample of 5,000 fossils from the Makapan cave. Among the fossils, some bones that could be used as tools—the lower jaw bones of small gazelles, which could be used as cutting tools, and the humerus of antelope, which could be used as clubs—were overrepresented (more frequent) by a factor of ten. This led Dart to theorize that in australopithecines, as man's direct ancestors, the use of weapons evolutionarily predated the development of large brains. Ardrey wrote an article about Dart's theory for The Reporter. After receiving significant attention, it was reprinted in Science Digest and led to The Smithsonian Institution contacting Dart. The theory was later refuted but was influential at the time.

This trip would serve as the beginning of Ardrey's renewed interest in the human sciences and the initiation of his writing on paleoanthropology.

Ardrey died in South Africa at age 71.

== Paleoanthropology ==
Ardrey spent the latter part of his life working as a science writer. In 1969 he was also contracted by Universal to write a screenplay of Baroness Karen Blixen's memoir Out of Africa, but it was never produced. While this work at first appears disparate with his early career, later commentators have emphasized the continuity. In his New York Times obituary, Bayard Webster wrote, "A closer look at his dramas and his behavioral books disclose that he was writing about social conditions in both genres. One involved humans, the other concerned both humans and other animals. But the dramatic theme was the same: the difficulties humans and other animals have in dealing with each other, and the reasons for their actions."

The writing quality of Ardrey's work was widely praised. The biologist and naturalist E. O. Wilson admired The Hunting Hypothesis, commenting:

In his excellent new book Robert Ardrey continues as the lyric poet of human evolution, capturing the Homeric quality of the subject that so many scientists by and large feel but are unable to put into words. His opinions, like those in his earlier works, are controversial but more open, squarely stated, and closer to the truth than the protests of his most scandalized critics.

In his 1964 book The Analysis of Prose, William D. Templeman used Ardrey's African Genesis for his third lesson. The volume included analysis and questions from his students at the University of Southern California.

His work was so popular that some scientists cited it as inspiring them to enter their fields.

Ardrey wrote for popular audiences on topics in paleoanthropology, which encompasses anthropology, ethology, paleontology, zoology and human evolution. He was praised for crossing the boundaries of scientific specialism. The Observer, for instance, in its 1970 review of The Social Contract, wrote that "Robert Ardrey ... leaps across the fences with which scientists nowadays surround their special subjects. He reports their findings in clear English. He attempts to relate them in a single science of Man, by which all of us may try to know ourselves."

This single "science of Man" was postulated in Ardrey's influential Nature of Man Series, which is composed of four books: African Genesis: A Personal Investigation into the Animal Origins and Nature of Man (1961), The Territorial Imperative: A Personal Inquiry Into the Animal Origins of Property and Nations (1966), The Social Contract: A Personal Inquiry into the Evolutionary Sources of Order and Disorder (1970), and The Hunting Hypothesis: A Personal Conclusion Concerning the Evolutionary Nature of Man (1976).

Along with Raymond Dart and Konrad Lorenz, Robert Ardrey became one of the three most famous proponents of the hunting hypothesis and the killer ape theory. Ardrey postulated that precursors of Australopithecus survived millions of years of drought in the Miocene and Pliocene epochs, as the savannah spread and the forests shrank, by adapting the hunting ways of carnivorous species. Changes in survival techniques and social organization gradually differentiated pre-humans from other primates. More meat in the diet increased brain function.

The killer ape theory posits that aggression, a vital factor in hunting prey for food, was a fundamental characteristic which distinguished prehuman ancestors from other primates. Ardrey also argued that aggression was therefore an inherited evolutionary trait still present in man. He challenged the reigning blank-slate hypothesis (similarly aligned with cultural determinism). The blank-slate hypothesis was defended (and Ardrey was famously attacked) by Ashley Montagu.

This debate led to popular interest in human origins. Ardrey's ideas influenced director Sam Peckinpah, to whom Strother Martin gave copies of two of Ardrey's books, as well as Arthur C. Clarke and Stanley Kubrick in the development of 2001: A Space Odyssey. More recently, according to archeology expert K. Kris Hirst, reviewing the Dawn of Humanity (2015 PBS film) documentary which describes the 2015 studies of fossils of Homo naledi, the violent behavior of apes in the "Dawn of Man" sequence of 2001 has been "proven false", since contemporary evidence suggests that they were actually vegetarians. Although Ardrey's theories on aggression have been disproven, his books influenced public views at the time.

These themes have also been investigated in academia by, among others:

- Konrad Lorenz: On Aggression (1966)
- University of Chicago "Man the Hunter" symposium (1966): Richard B. Lee and Irven DeVore, eds., Man the Hunter: Symposium on Man the Hunter, University of Chicago. Chicago: Aldine Publishing.
- Sherwood Washburn and Chet Lancaster: Man the Hunter (1968). (Washburn's students Lee and DeVore organised the 1966 Chicago conference.)
- Craig Stanford: The Hunting Apes: Meat Eating and the Origins of Human Behavior, Princeton University Press (2001).
- Erich Fromm: The Anatomy of Human Destructiveness (1973)
- Matt Cartmill: A View to a Death in the Morning: Hunting and Nature Through History (1996)

=== Researchers ===
Some scientists whose research informed Robert Ardrey's ideas, several of whom Ardrey consulted while writing his four books in Africa:

- Warder Clyde Allee
- Charles Kimberlin Brain
- Robert Broom
- Helmut Karl Buechner
- Clarence Ray Carpenter
- Raymond Dart
- Henry Eliot Howard
- James Kitching
- Louis Leakey
- Eugène Marais
- Kenneth Oakley
- George Schaller

=== Criticism ===
A 1964 review by Michael Crichton said "Much of African Genesis is pure speculation, much is bad interpretation of well-known phenomena, and more than a little of it is simply untrue."

A 1966 review by Edmund Leach said Ardrey was "a mine of scientific-sounding misinformation" and his book was "noisy and foolish".

A 1967 review by Patrick Bateson said "The arguments on which he bases his conclusions are shot through with such elementary mistakes, and his definitions are so loose, that he will surely mislead anyone who takes him seriously . . . Ardrey seems to be scarcely aware of the interactions involved in biological processes and to know nothing of the scientific method."

A 1970 review by Carroll Quigley said "Ardrey pretends to be a scientist, or at least a science reporter; but in this book there is no more science than there is in a comic strip . . . It is true that Ardrey has read a great deal about animal behavior, but he never seems to grasp what it all means, and his biases prevent him from seeing what is really there."

Around 1970, anthropologist Sherwood Washburn described Ardrey as "a popularizer of data he does not understand".

A 1970 review by C. E. S. Franks said "however well written they may be, his books are neither scientific works nor the works of a scientist. Robert Ardrey has misunderstood two of the basic concepts of the new biology, "aggression" and "territory", and has misapplied them in discussing human society".

A 1972 review by anthropologist Michael G. Kenny said "though Ardrey says on occasion that one cannot reasonably argue from animals to man, he systematically ignores his own advice" and that Ardrey "does not in general cite any clear evidence for his case" and "pays no attention at all to much material which, for good or ill, could bear on his case. The result is that he became so thoroughly muddled there was no possibility that he might have given some kind of sense to the analysis of the bio-social nature of society".

A 1972 review by David Pilbeam said Ardrey's ideas were "based upon misinterpretation of ethological studies and a total ignorance of the rich variety of human behavior documented by anthropologists".

A 1976 review said "Ardrey started with an idea that he derived from Raymond Dart and set out to prove it by selecting only the evidence that favored his viewpoint".

A 1984 article said "the hard evidence for Ardrey's killer-ape hypothesis, all from Dart, is slim" and was refuted in the early 1970s by paleontologists, in particular CK Brain and Elisabeth Vrba.

A 1996 article by anthropologist Glenn E. King suggested Ardrey was a pseudoscientist. King said "when a person who is 'not a formally trained scientist' who flatly contradicts highly trained experts who have done original research" and "that person accuses scientists of avoiding 'awkward facts' that contradict their views, this is the typical rhetoric of the pseudoscientist seeking the support (and usually the money) of a gullible public". King cited Ardrey as an example of this.

A 2023 article said the disconfirmation of Ardrey's theories started arriving as early as 1966.

== Books ==
Fiction

- Worlds Beginning (1944) (Cited in Everett F. Bleiler's The Checklist of Fantastic Literature, 1948.)
- The Brotherhood of Fear (1952)
- Plays of Three Decades: Thunder Rock / Jeb / Shadow of Heroes (1968) (Includes an autobiographical preface)

Nonfiction

- African Genesis: A Personal Investigation into the Animal Origins and Nature of Man (1961)
- The Territorial Imperative: A Personal Inquiry into the Animal Origins of Property and Nations (1966)
- The Social Contract: A Personal Inquiry into the Evolutionary Sources of Order and Disorder (1970)
- The Hunting Hypothesis: A Personal Conclusion Concerning the Evolutionary Nature of Man (1976)
- Aggression and Violence in Man: A Dialogue Between Dr. L.S.B. Leakey and Robert Ardrey (1971) OCLC 631758464 Online version

== Plays ==
- Star Spangled (1936)
- Casey Jones (1938)
- How to Get Tough About It (1938)
- Thunder Rock (1939) (filmed in 1942 in the UK, released 1944 in the US)
- God and Texas (1943)
- Jeb (1946)
- Sing Me No Lullaby (1954)
- Shadow of Heroes (1958) (produced in London as Stone and Star)

== Screenplays ==
- They Knew What They Wanted (1940)
- A Lady Takes a Chance (1943)
- The Green Years (1946)
- Song of Love (1947)
- The Three Musketeers (1948)
- Madame Bovary (1949)
- The Secret Garden (1949)
- The Schumann Story (1950) short film adaptation of Song of Love
- The Adventures of Quentin Durward (1955)
- The Power and the Prize (1956)
- The Wonderful Country (1959)
- Four Horsemen of the Apocalypse (1962)
- Khartoum (1966) Nominated for an Academy Award for Writing Original Screenplay
- Out of Africa (1969, unproduced)
- The Animal Within (1975) documentary

== Awards and honors ==
- 1935: Sergel Drama Award.
- 1937: Guggenheim Fellowship.
- 1940: Sidney Howard Memorial Award.
- 1961: Theresa Helburn Memorial Award.
- 1963: Willkie Brothers Grant for Anthropology.
- Fellow of the Royal Society of Literature

== See also ==
- Dawn of Humanity (2015 PBS film)

== Additional resources ==
There are a number of university libraries that house Robert Ardrey's papers. The primary archive for the Robert Ardrey Collection is at the Howard Gotlieb Archival Research Center in the Mugar Memorial Library at Boston University. There are also additional collections of Robert Ardrey's works held at UCLA, Rutgers, and the University of Chicago.
