= Casey Jones (play) =

1938 play written by Robert Ardrey

- Playbill of original Broadway production
- Written by: Robert Ardrey
- Characters: Casey Jones
- Original language: English
- Genre: Drama

Premiere
- Place premiered: Fulton Theatre, Broadway

Casey Jones is a 1938 dramatic play by Robert Ardrey.

Casey Jones was produced in the United States by the Group Theater. It was the first of two Robert Ardrey plays that were produced by the Group, the second being the more-famous Thunder Rock. The play had a very short run. it opened at the Fulton Theatre on February 19, 1938, and closed on March 1 after 25 performances. The director was Elia Kazan, the scenic design was by Mordecai Gorelik, and the title role was played by Charles Bickford.

== Synopsis ==
Casey Jones is the story of a modernized version of the eponymous hero of folklore. In the play, Casey is dedicated to his locomotive. He uses his dedication to the engine as an escape from a world that he doesn't understand. Aboard his engine he feels like a king.

However, Casey neglects his family and personal life to conduct the engine. Furthermore, he learns he is going blind. He insists on running his engine even as his vision fades. Casey is forced into retirement by the Railroad Company, but remains loyal to them. He refuses his pension, saying "The company owes me nothing." Then Casey moves into a cramped boarding house where he struggles to move around the steep steps and the furniture. In the script, the boarding house is conceptualized as Casey's tomb. Just before the closing curtain Casey collapses, realizing that he has been a slave to the railroad company for his entire life.

== Themes ==
According to Christine White, "The message of Casey Jones [is] that men become dependent on the self-meaning they get from their work in life, therefore, men are captured by the modern machines they work with."

It was also Ardrey's intention to write about the working class and capture their dialect in dialogue. Again, according to White: "Ardrey had a genuine affection for ordinary human beings, whose language he loved and captured beautifully in his dialogue. He wanted to write about them because they were the essence of America, and he had his own ideas about the proper way to do it."

Ardrey, later remarking on the play in an interview in The Times, underscored the idea that he wanted to write about the working class characters as they were:

It has never been an American tradition to speak truly of the people. Always we have thought of them wishfully, according to our own ends. A social evangelist, in a far-away temple, shouts loudly of the people and class solidarity. Are these Americans class conscious? I can only show them to you and say, judge for yourselves. ... It would seem to me that an unschooled man who is aware and puzzled is frequently more intelligent than a man with an educated mind, convinced and closed. But that's merely my judgment, so don't accept it. Accept only my people and judge for yourself."

== Reception ==
Casey Jones was met with mostly positive reviews. The praise, in general, focused on the strength of the writing, the accomplishment of the acting, and the impressiveness of the stage design. Among notable positive reviewers were Burns Mantle, Richard Watts, Jr., and Brooks Atkinson. Atkinson, writing for The New York Times, said "Robert Ardrey has extraordinary Flair. He has chosen a fresh subject and populated it with pungent characters; he has also worked at it with drollery and excitement. Casey Jones is written with humorous insight into the character of odd and muscular men; the dialogue is spontaneously original; the scenes are comic and sympathetic."
