= Thunder Rock (play) =

1939 play by Robert Ardrey

- Original language: English
- Written by: Robert Ardrey
- Characters: Charleston, Streeter, Nonny, Inspector Flanning, Captain Joshua, Briggs, Dr. Stephan Kurtz, Melanie, Anne Marie, Miss Kirby, Chang
- Subject: World War II, American Isolationism
- Genre: Drama
- Setting: Thunder Rock Lighthouse, Lake Michigan

Premiere
- Date: November 14, 1939
- Place: Mansfield Theatre

Thunder Rock is a 1939 play by Robert Ardrey.

The initial Broadway production, put on by the Group Theater and directed by Elia Kazan, closed after a short run, but the play was far more successful in wartime London. Thunder Rock became a symbol of British resistance and was the most notable play of World War II. It was first produced in a little-known theater in South Kensington but was transferred, with secret funding from Her Majesty's Treasury, to the Globe Theatre in London's West End.

Thunder Rock has seen many adaptations, including a BBC radio version in 1940 and a 1942 film starring Michael Redgrave and Barbara Mullen with James Mason in a minor role. In 1947 CBS broadcast a radio production; it was awarded a Peabody Award. Stage productions have been mounted all over the world, including an unauthorized production in Zurich, a U.S. government-sponsored production in occupied Berlin, and popular post-war productions throughout Europe and Africa, including in Harare and Nairobi.

== Synopsis ==
The Dramatists Play Service gives the following synopsis of Thunder Rock:

The action passes in a lighthouse on Lake Michigan. Charleston, the keeper, has taken a job there to flee from a detestable world. Opposing Charleston's pessimism, Streeter, his friend, says he is giving up his job to become an active member of society again. Streeter believes our world can be brought out of its chaos if people do something about it. Filled with this determination, he leaves to become an aviator. Charleston retreats further into a fantastic world of his own building. The people of this world are half a dozen of the sixty who were shipwrecked ninety years ago. Believing that "Mankind's got one future—in the past," Charleston breathes life into these creatures of his imagination. They live again on the stage. As he talks to them we see passengers as they really were, each seeking sanctuary from a disturbed Europe, running away from life, yet needing the same hope and strength as Charleston himself. Charleston's sincerity convinces these creatures that he really has the courage to lead his fellow men into a better world, and in this faith they are content to die again. Inspired by their confidence, the lighthouse-keeper returns to useful work, determined to create a new order out of the chaos of the old.

== Conception ==
The initial inspiration for Thunder Rock came in 1938 while the playwright, Robert Ardrey, then on an extended honeymoon on Nantucket, was working on a different play. He writes in his autobiography of being taken by the image of the lighthouse at Siansconset and by the drama of the frequent nor'easters. At the same time, the conflict in Europe was escalating, and Ardrey took the signing of the Munich Agreement to be a certain harbinger of war. Ardrey did not have the idea for the play, however, until he returned to New York. He writes in his autobiography of the moment of inspiration during a performance of Swan Lake:

That afternoon, eyes closed, enjoying the music with moderation, I descended into a world between the Tigris and the Styx. And within the course of the performance I had beheld Thunder Rock. I had the play from beginning to end, complete with the first, second, and third act curtains. I never had the experience again, and I must wonder how many authors have gone through a similar spell.

Ardrey moved with his wife, Helen, to New Orleans, where he wrote the first draft.

== New York production ==
Having finished the first draft Ardrey showed it to his agent, Harold Freedman, and to his friend, the influential Broadway director and producer Elia Kazan, who had directed Casey Jones. Kazan engaged Harold Clurman to direct members of the theater collective The Group Theater, including Lee J. Cobb, Morris Carnovsky, and Frances Farmer. The production was mounted at the Mansfield Theater (now the Brooks Atkinson Theater). Rehearsals were begun amidst growing tension in Europe, and the company, convinced that war would break out within weeks, resolved to open as quickly as they could. However, after the Invasion of Poland there was a period of relative quiet in Europe, leading to a belief in America that the threat had been overblown. Senator William Borah during this period famously dubbed the conflict "The Phoney War." The play, which called for American involvement in a crisis in Europe, debuted to an increasingly isolationist audience amid a growing conception that there would be no war.

=== Reception ===
The negative criticism of Thunder Rock largely focused on its call to intervention. John Anderson wrote, "The Group is playing spook-a-boo at the Mansfield theater." Brooks Atkinson, writing for The New York Times, wrote that "Thunder Rock exudes so much thunder, and contains so little rock." The play ended up closing after 23 performances.

Thunder Rock also won acclaim. In 1940, in recognition of the play, Ardrey was awarded the first ever Sidney Howard Memorial Award for young playwrights. It inspired many subsequent productions.

== London productions ==
During the winter of 1939 Ardrey's Broadway agent Harold Freedman sold the British rights of Thunder Rock to the London theater director Herbert Marshall. Marshall sent the script to then rising star Michael Redgrave, who later wrote, "I thought it one of the most exciting plays I had ever read." Redgrave agreed to star, and they launched a production at the Neighbourhood Theatre in London. The company included Bernard Miles, Fredda Brilliant, and Frederick Valk. After the Battle of Dunkirk most London theaters voluntarily closed, and when Thunder Rock went up, two nights after the Fall of France, it was one of only two productions in London.

The first London production of Thunder Rock was a huge and unqualified success. The eminent British theater critic Harold Hobson wrote that the opening night was "One of the greatest evenings … in the entire history of the theatre."

When Winston Churchill read of the play, he sent his Minister of Information, Duff Cooper; his scientific advisor, Lord Lindeman; and his wife, Clementine. Duff Cooper reported back to Churchill, who is said to have told his cabinet that "This play is the greatest contribution to British Morale there has yet been." He had Cooper arrange to have the treasury department fund it. Cooper coordinated with Michael Redgrave to transfer the production to the Globe Theatre in London's West End. The role of the government in funding the arrangement was kept secret until after the war. The BBC also broadcast a live radio production with the theater cast on July 15, 1940, at 10:15 PM.

The production at the Globe ran during the worsening Blitz. During air-raids the play would be paused and Michael Redgrave would lead the audience in songs. The playbill carried the following warning:

You will be notified from the Stage if an Air Raid Warning has been sounded during the performance—but that does not necessarily mean an air raid will take place.

If you wish to leave for home or an official Air Raid Shelter you are at liberty to do so. All we ask is that—if you feel you must go—you will depart quietly and without excitement.

Again the production was a massive critical and popular success. It ran at the Globe until September, when the neighboring Queen's Theatre was hit by a German bomb. With the closure of West End theatres, the production went on tour from September to November, with Alec Guinness replacing Redgrave. A West End revival, at the St Martin's Theatre, followed from February to April 1941, with Walter Hudd as Charleston.

=== Reception ===
Both the initial run at the Neighborhood Theater and the government-funded run at the Globe were major critical and popular successes. James Agate wrote that Thunder Rock was "a play infinitely superior in craftsmanship, intellectual interest, pure theater and entertainment value to anything the commercial theater can offer in these heartsearching days." The News and Chronicle described it as "A tonic to the mind, and a bath to the spirit." The reviewer for The London Times Literary Supplement wrote “When Thunder Rock was produced for the first time in this country ... there ensued a chorus of praise that sounded almost suspicious. Can this play be as good as all that? one asked oneself, or is it merely that the gentlemen of the press, starved of something to genuinely appreciate, have leaped with an indiscriminating gusto upon the first good thing that comes their way? A visit to the theatre, however, and a subsequent reading of the play set these doubts at rest."

Eminent theater critic Harold Hobson later reflected on the significance of Thunder Rock:

"The theatre… did a great deal to keep the morale of the British people high. One intellectual play had an enormous effect in keeping alight a spirit of hope at a time when it was nearer to extinction than it had ever been, either before or after. This was Thunder Rock, by Robert Ardrey. What he accomplished for the British people at a moment of supreme despair… merits their lasting gratitude. … He, more quietly but equally effectively as Churchill, urged us never to surrender."

== Subsequent productions and legacy ==
When the London production closed, Thunder Rock was taken on the road. The cast was the same except that Alec Guinness took over for Michael Redgrave. It played in British cities including Manchester and Birmingham.

Within six weeks after V-E day a production of Thunder Rock had been launched in Vienna. By the fall of 1945 the play was up in Budapest and Prague. Thunder Rock was the first play to go up in Allied-occupied Germany (except for a failed Russian production of Our Town) when the American forces staged a production in the American-occupied zone of Berlin. The American production starred Ernst Busch, a German singer and actor who had fled Germany in 1933, joined the International Brigades to fight against the Nationalists, risen to fame for his Spanish war songs, been taken prisoner in Belgium, and who were liberated from a POW camp at the end of the war. General J. L. Whitelaw, then Deputy Chief of Staff of the U.S. Headquarters in Berlin, gave a speech on the night before the opening, to mark the occasion of the presentation of the first theater license in the American zone of occupied Berlin. He said that "perhaps the historians will hold this year, 1945, as the beginning of a resistant freedom of expression." The play has since been produced in over forty German cities.

1942 saw a film adaptation of Thunder Rock, directed by the Boulting Brothers and starring Michael Redgrave. In 1946 the BBC produced a version adapted for television by Peter Sims, starring Robert Sansom.

The play has subsequently been produced all over the world, including in Harare (formerly Salisbury), Zimbabwe, and Nairobi, Kenya. It was translated into French as La Tour d'ivoire ("The Ivory Tower") and produced in Paris in 1958 at the Théâtre des Bouffes-Parisiens. It was also translated into a very well-received Arabic version. It continues to be popular among University theater departments. In 2012 Dennis Delaney included it in his list of "100 Plays You Should Have Read but Probably Haven't."

Thunder Rock is one of the two Robert Ardrey plays still made available for production by the Dramatists Play Service. The other is his 1954 play about the treatment of accused communists in post-Cold War America, Sing Me No Lullaby.

Later commentators have remarked upon the prescient nature of Thunder Rock. As a call to American intervention in the crisis in Europe it presaged the collapse of American isolationism. It was also one of the few pieces of art to focus not only on the European, but also the Asian threat. Albert Wertheim remarked, "Ardrey's play is remarkable in another way as well. It is one of the only—perhaps the only—play of the period to see the conflicts and dangers across the Pacific. All other pre-Pearl Harbor plays of note look exclusively across the Atlantic to Hitler, Mussolini, and Europe."

Elia Kazan, director of the original Broadway production, reflected fondly on the play later in his career. He wrote "This is a deeply democratic and deeply optimistic play, written at a time when there was a good deal of pessimism about democracy." Robert Ardrey reflected that "Thunder Rock was the only play I ever wrote that may be regarded as an international classic."
