= Hippius =

Hippius may refer to:

- Hippius family, Baltic German family
- Hippius (surname)
- Hippios (disambiguation)
