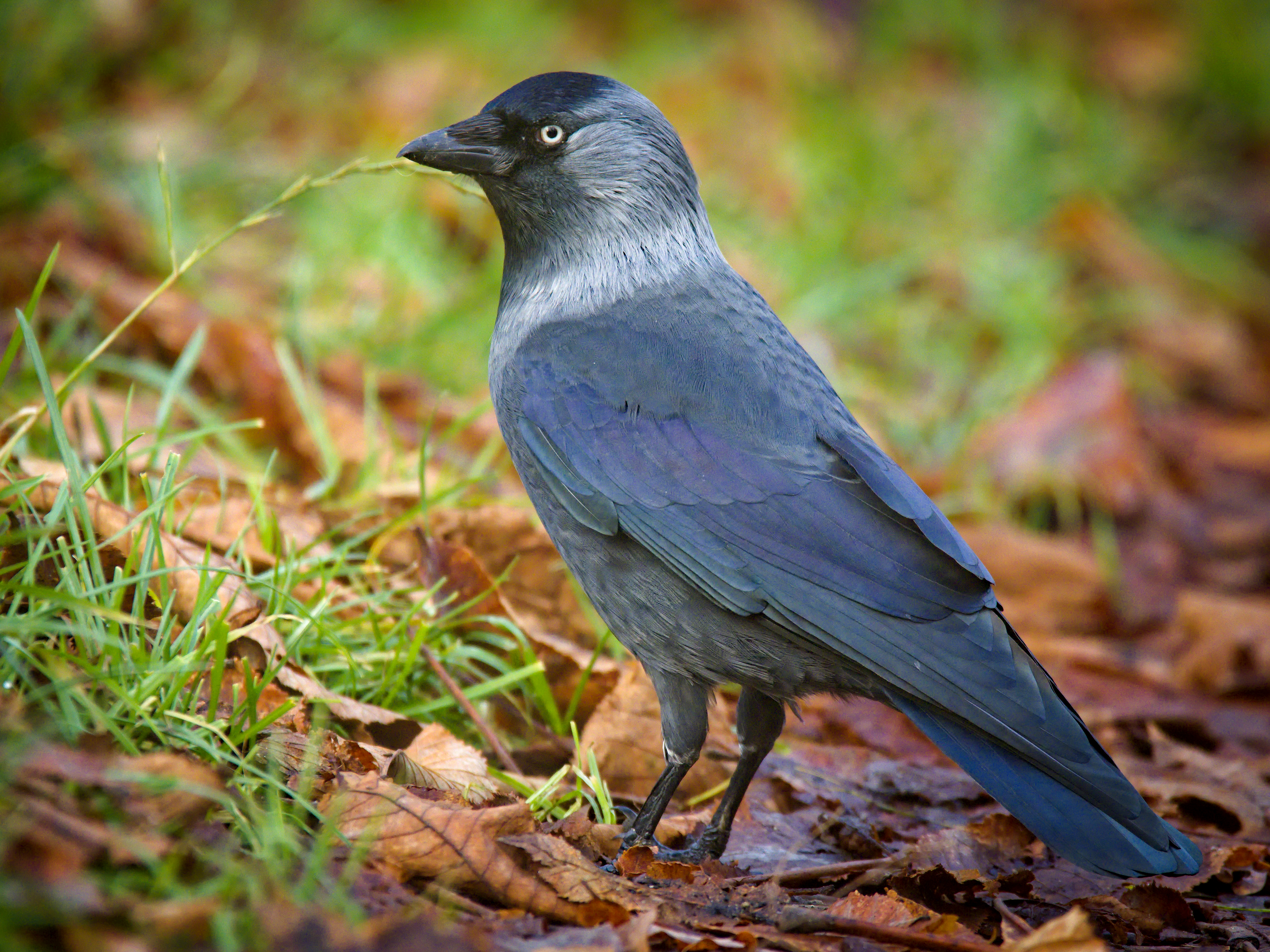
- Coloeus monedula monedula, Poland

Conservation status
- Least Concern (IUCN 3.1)

Scientific classification
- Kingdom: Animalia
- Phylum: Chordata
- Class: Aves
- Order: Passeriformes
- Family: Corvidae
- Genus: Coloeus
- Species: C. monedula

Binomial name
- Coloeus monedula (Linnaeus, 1758)
- Extant, breeding Extant, resident Extant, non-breeding Extant & introduced, resident Extinct & introduced

Synonyms
- Corvus monedula Linnaeus, 1758

Audio
- Western jackdaw calls (Estonia)

= Western jackdaw =

Species of bird in the crow family Corvidae

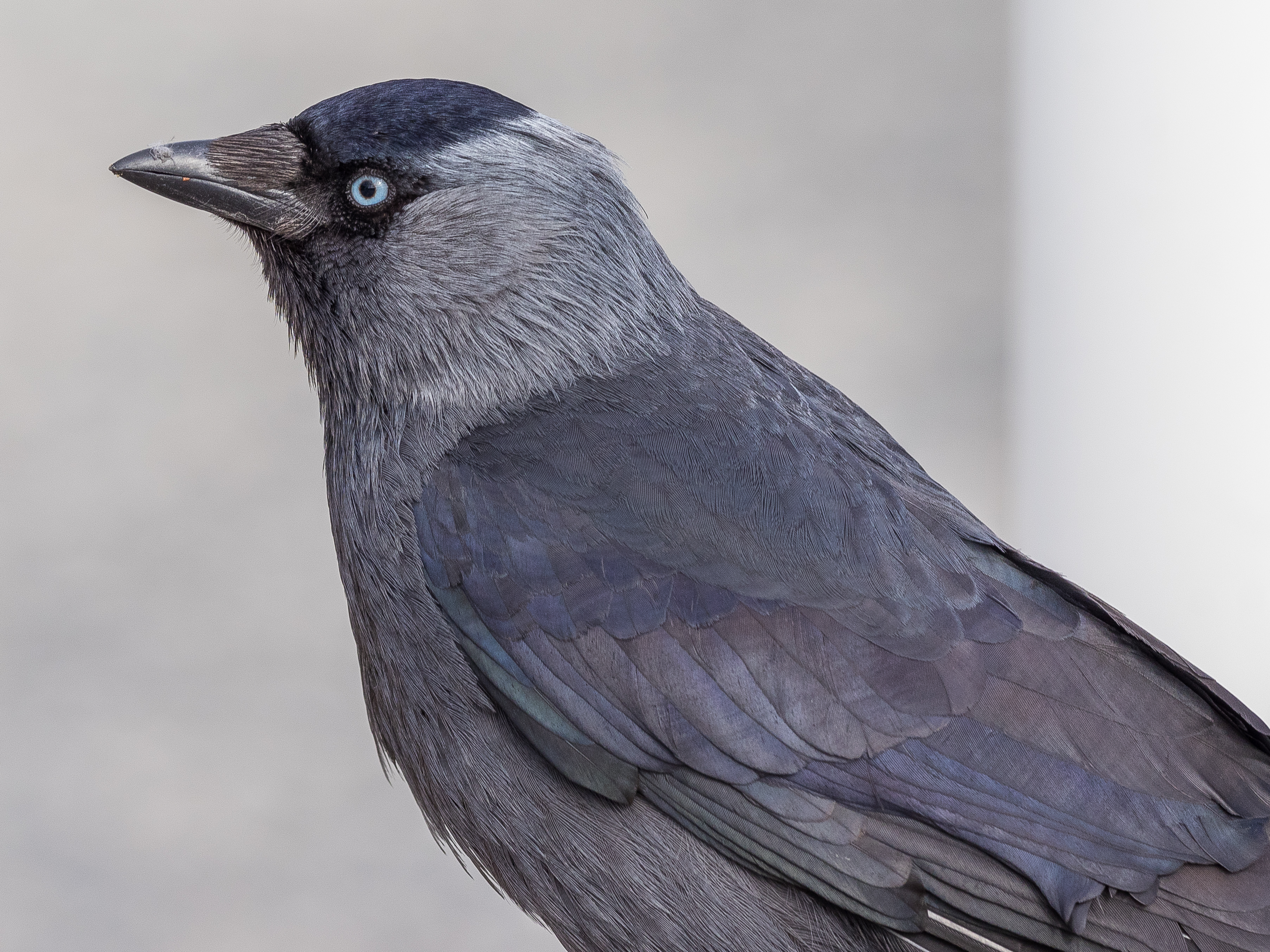
Adult C. m. monedula, Vaxholm, Sweden

The western jackdaw (Coloeus monedula), also known as the Eurasian jackdaw, the European jackdaw, or simply the jackdaw, is a passerine bird in the crow family. It is found across Europe, western Asia and western North Africa; it is mostly resident, although northern and eastern populations migrate south in the winter. Four subspecies are recognised, which differ mainly in the darker or paler greyscale of the plumage on the head and nape. Linnaeus first described it formally, giving it the name Corvus monedula. The common name derives from the word jack, denoting "small", and daw, a less common synonym for "jackdaw", and the native English name for the bird.

Measuring 34–39 centimetres (13–15 in) in length, the western jackdaw is a black-plumaged bird with a grey nape and distinctive pale iris. It is gregarious and vocal, living in small groups with a complex social structure in farmland, open woodland, on coastal cliffs, and in urban settings. Like its relatives, jackdaws are intelligent birds, and have been observed using tools. An omnivorous and opportunistic feeder, it eats a wide variety of plant material and invertebrates, as well as food waste from urban areas. Western jackdaws are monogamous and build simple nests of sticks in cavities in trees, cliffs, or buildings. About five pale blue or mint green eggs with brown to grey speckles are laid and incubated by the female. The young fledge in four to five weeks.

== Systematics ==
=== Etymology ===
The western jackdaw was one of the many species originally described by Carl Linnaeus in his 18th century work Systema Naturae. Owing to its supposed fondness for picking up coins, Linnaeus gave it the binomial name Corvus monedula, choosing the specific name mǒnēdŭla, which is derived from moneta, the Latin stem of the word "money". Jackdaws are now placed in the genus Coloeus, from the Ancient Greek κολοιός (koloios) for jackdaw, while most older works retained the two jackdaw species in Corvus.

Old English had a wide range of words that could denote jackdaws, most of which were to some extent onomatopoeic, imitating the western jackdaw's call. Several, however, are first attested only in the names of places and people and might have denoted other corvids as well as or instead of jackdaws. The terms included cā (found, for example, in the place-names Cawood and Kaber, which in Scottish and north English dialects became ka or kae, and in more southerly accents co, coo, and coe) and cawe or cāwe. As many as three jackdaw-words seem to have derived from a proto-Indo-European root */gewH-/ meaning something like "call, cry out": ċēo and ċēawe (both no longer used), along with *ċēoh, which became modern English chough. Chough now refers to corvids of the genus Pyrrhocorax: the red-billed chough (Pyrrhocorax pyrrhocorax), formerly particularly common in Cornwall, became known initially as the "Cornish chough" and then just the "chough", the name transferring from one species to the other. Yet Chaucer sometimes used chough to refer to the western jackdaw, as perhaps did Shakespeare in Hamlet (although there has been debate about which species he was referring to). There is also some evidence for a noun ċeahhe, etymologically meaning "cackler".

The word daw, widely used for the western jackdaw, is first attested as a word in its own right in English only in the late fifteenth century, but cognate words in other Germanic languages (such as Old High German tāha, Middle High German tāhe or tāchele, and modern German Dahle or Dohle, alongside dialectal Tach, Dähi, Däche and Dacha) show that *dāw must have existed in Old English. Daw is probably first attested in English as part of the compound nouns cādāc (first attested in 843) and caddow (first attested around 1440). It is thought to be of onomatopoeic origin, imitating one of the jackdaw's commonest calls.

Daw became the basis of today's common name jackdaw, first attested in the 16th century. This is thought to be a compound of daw with the forename Jack, used in animal names to signify a small form (e.g. jack snipe) or laddish behaviour, or as an onomatopoeic representation of the jackdaw's metallic chyak call.

Other names in English dialects are numerous. Other dialectal or obsolete names include caddesse, cawdaw, caddy, chauk, college-bird, jackerdaw, jacko, ka-wattie, chimney-sweep bird (from their nesting propensities), and sea-crow (from the frequency with which they are found on coasts). It was also frequently known quasi-nominally as Jack.

An archaic collective noun for a group of jackdaws is a "clattering". Another name for a flock is a "train".

=== Taxonomy ===
A study in 2000 found that the genetic distance between western jackdaws and the other members of Corvus was greater than that within the rest of the genus. This led Pamela Rasmussen to reinstate the genus name Coloeus, created by Johann Kaup in 1829, in her Birds of South Asia (2005), a treatment also used in a 1982 systematic list in German by Hans Edmund Wolters. A study of corvid phylogeny undertaken in 2007 compared DNA sequences in the mitochondrial control region of several corvids. It found that the western jackdaw, and the closely related Daurian jackdaw (C. dauuricus) of eastern Russia and China, were basal to the core Corvus clade. The names Coloeus monedula and Coloeus dauuricus have since been adopted by the International Ornithological Congress in their official list. The two species of jackdaw have been reported to hybridise in the Altai Mountains, southern Siberia, and Mongolia. Analysis of the mitochondrial DNA of specimens of the two species from their core ranges show them to be genetically distinct.

=== Subspecies ===
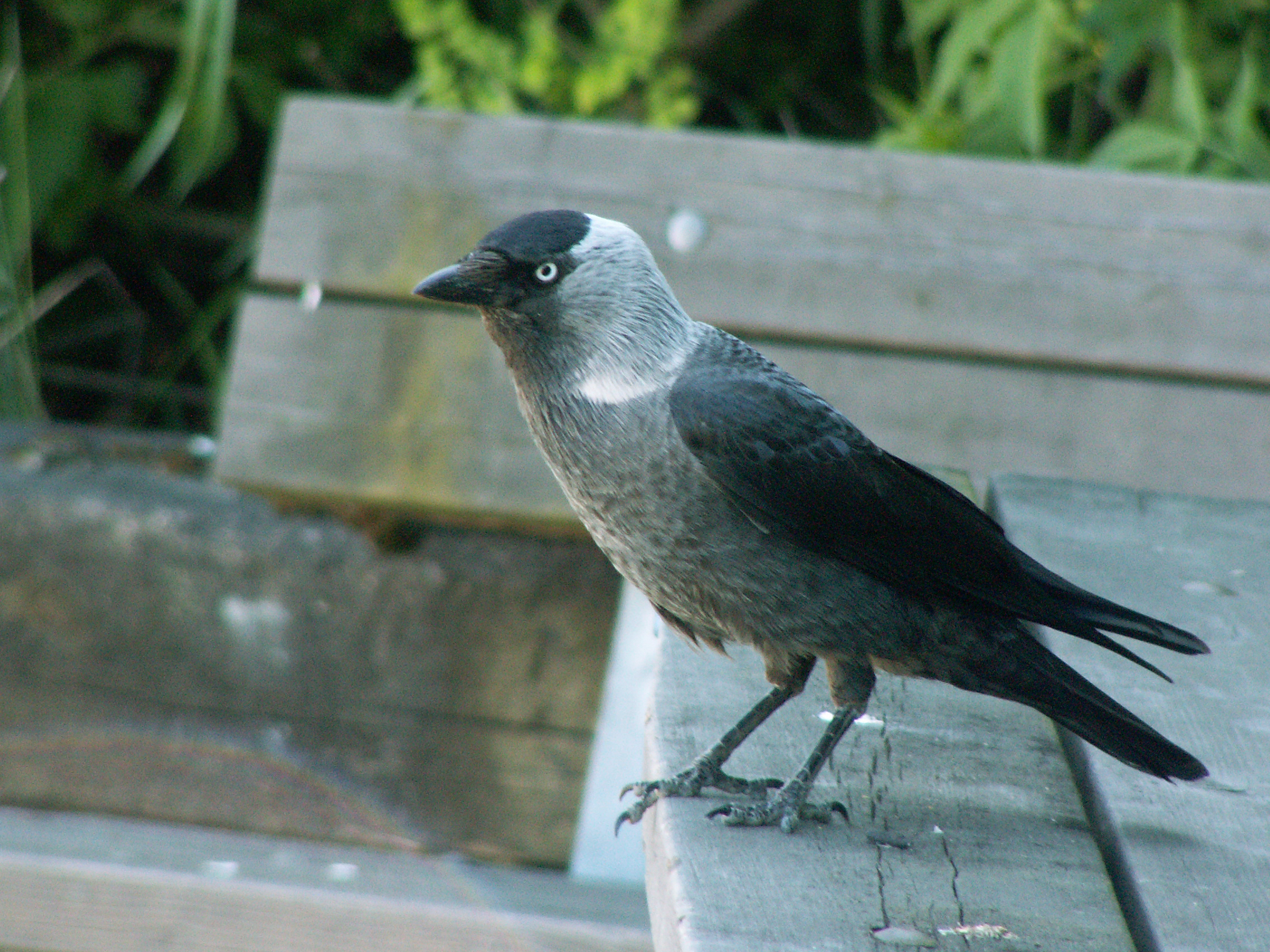
C. m. monedula in Sweden. This subspecies has a whitish partial collar.

There are four recognised subspecies of the western jackdaw. All the European subspecies intergrade where their populations meet. C. m. monedula intergrades into C. m. soemmerringii in a transition zone running from Finland south across the Baltic and eastern Poland to Romania and Croatia.

- The Nordic jackdaw (C. m. monedula) (Linnaeus, 1758), the nominate subspecies, is found in eastern Europe. Its range extends across Scandinavia, from southern Finland south to Esbjerg and Haderslev in Denmark, through eastern Germany and Poland, and south across eastern central Europe to the Carpathian Mountains and northwestern Romania, Vojvodina in northern Serbia, and Slovenia. It breeds in south-eastern Norway, southern Sweden, and northern and eastern Denmark, with occasional wintering in England and France. It has been recorded as a rare vagrant to Spain. It has a pale nape and sides of the neck, a dark throat, and a light grey partial collar of variable extent.
- The Western Eurasian jackdaw (C. m. spermologus) (Vieillot, 1817) occurs in western, central and southern Europe and North Africa, from the British Isles, the Netherlands and the Rhineland in the north, through western Switzerland into Italy in the southeast, and the Iberian peninsula and Morocco in the south. It winters in the Canary Islands and Corsica. The name "spermologus" comes from the Greek σπερμολόγος, a picker of seeds. It is darker in colour than the other subspecies and lacks the whitish border at the base of the grey nape.
- The Eastern Eurasian jackdaw (C. m. soemmerringii) (Fischer von Waldheim, 1811) is found in northeastern Europe and northern and central Asia from the former Soviet Union to Lake Baikal and northwestern Mongolia and south to Turkey, Israel and the eastern Himalayas. Its southwestern limits are Serbia and southern Romania. It winters in Iran and northern India (Kashmir). Johann Fischer von Waldheim described this taxon as Corvus soemmerringii in 1811, noting its differences from populations in western Europe. Its subspecific name was given in honour of the German anatomist Samuel Thomas von Sömmerring. It is distinguished by the nape and the sides of the neck being paler, creating a contrasting black crown and lighter grey part collar.
- The Algerian jackdaw (C. m. cirtensis) (Rothschild and Hartert, 1912) is found in Morocco and Algeria in Northwest Africa. It was also formerly found in Tunisia. The name "cirtensis" refers to the ancient city of Cirta in Numidia. The plumage is duller and more uniformly dark grey than the other subspecies, with the paler nape less distinct.

== Description ==
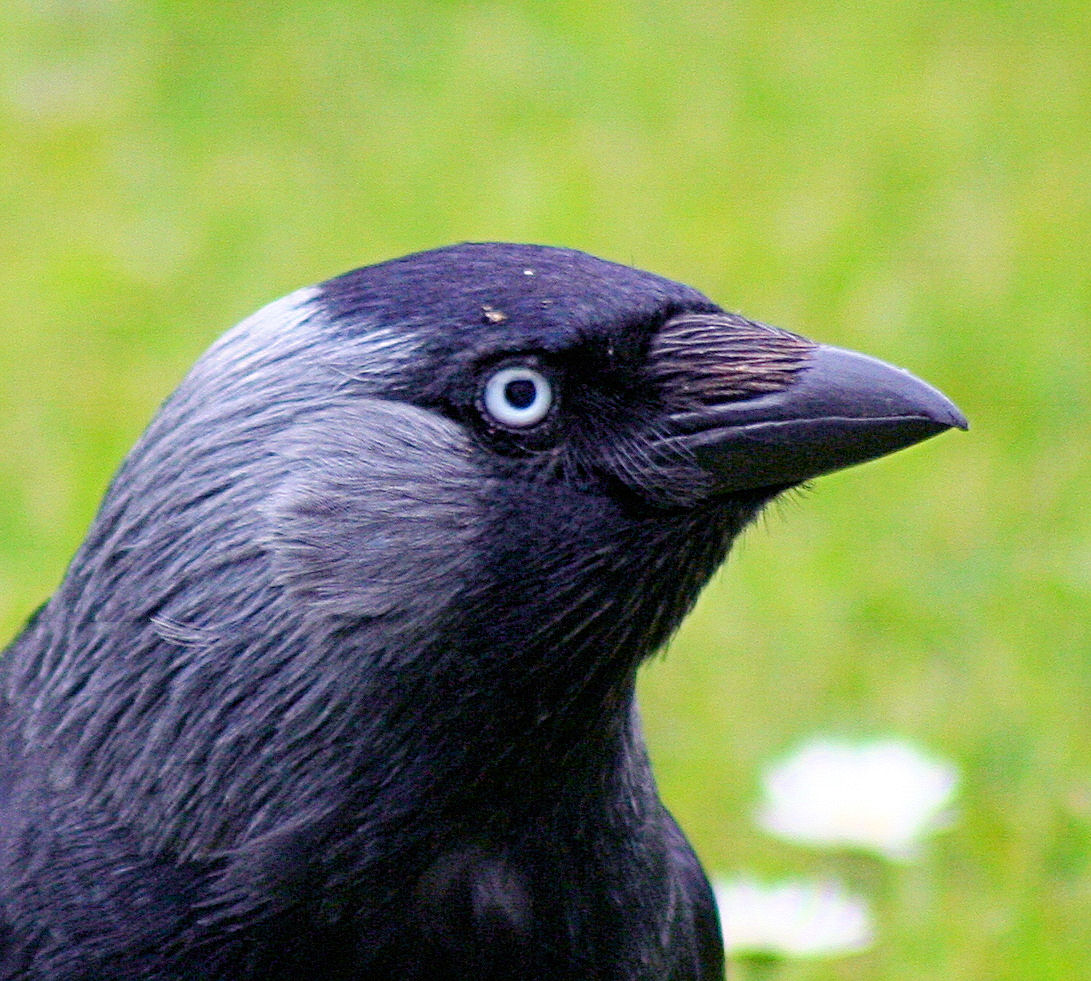
Adult C. m. spermologus, showing the rictal bristles cover much of the bill.

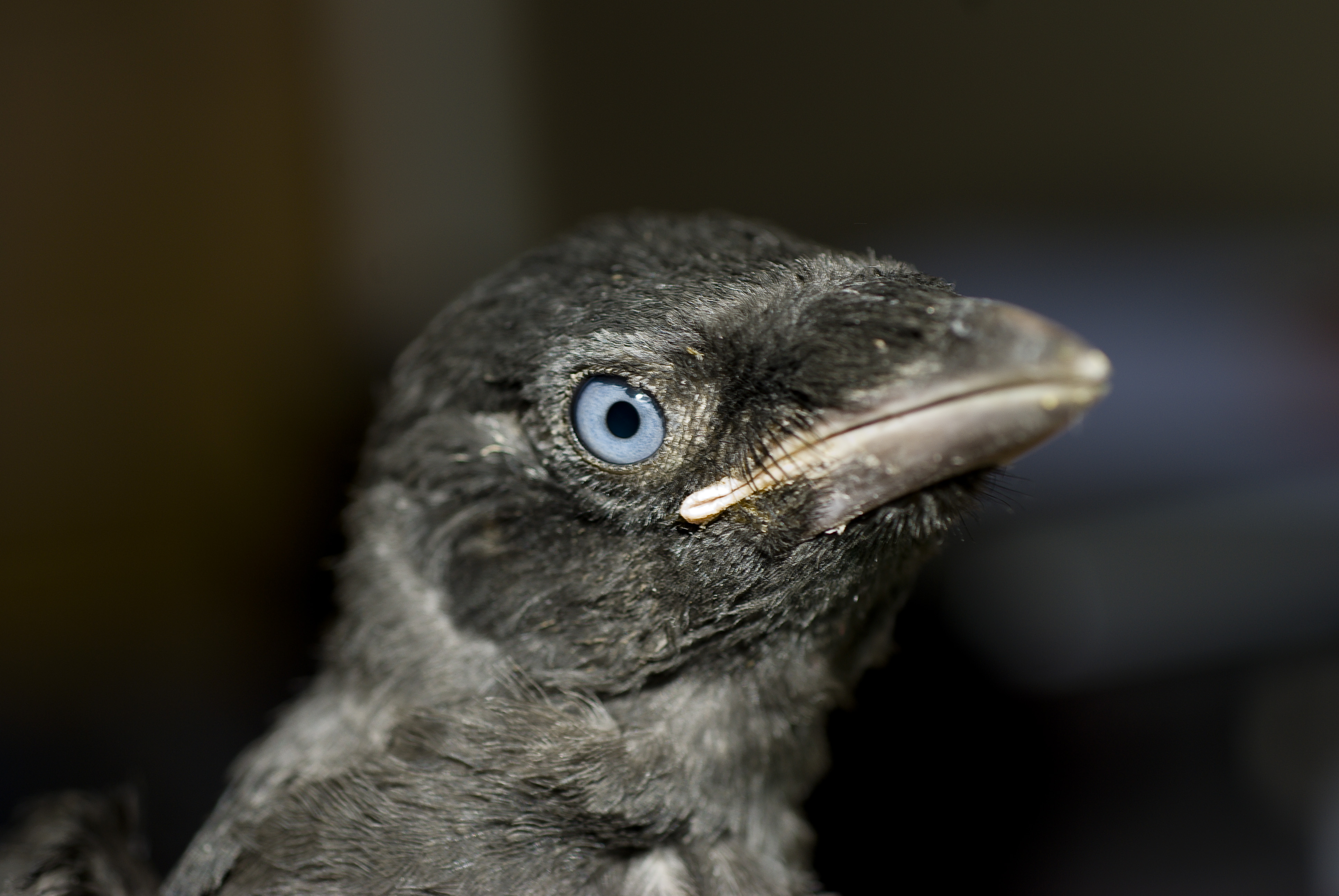
Juvenile C. m. spermologus, Newcastle upon Tyne, England.

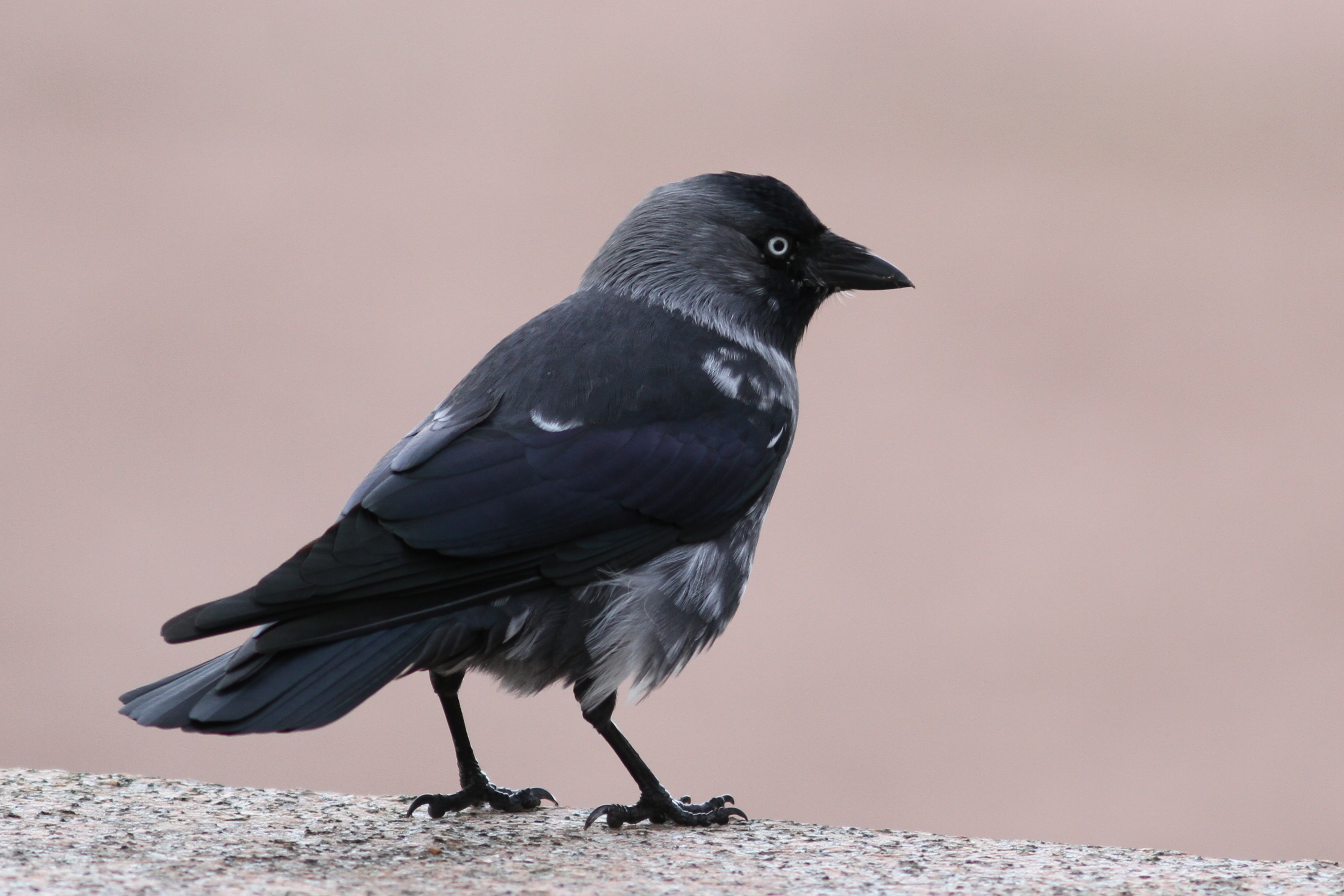
Partially leucistic individual with white feathers in Naantali cemetery, Naantali, Finland

The western jackdaw measures 34–39 centimetres (13–15 in) in length and weighs around 240 grams (8.5 oz). Most of the plumage is a shiny black, with a purple (in subspecies monedula and spermologus) or blue (in subspecies cirtensis and soemmerringii) sheen on the crown, forehead, and secondaries, and a green-blue sheen on the throat, primaries, and tail. The cheeks, nape and neck are light grey to greyish-silver, and the underparts are slate-grey. The legs are black, as is the short stout bill, the length of which is about 75% of the length of the rest of the head. There are rictal bristles covering around 40% of the maxilla and 25% of the lower mandible. The irises of adults are greyish or silvery white while those of juveniles are light blue, becoming brownish before whitening at around one year of age. The sexes look alike, though the head and neck plumage of male birds fades more with age and wear, particularly just before moulting. Western jackdaws undergo a complete moult from June to September in the western parts of their range, and a month later in the east. The purplish sheen of the cap is most prominent just after moulting.

Immature birds have duller and less demarcated plumage. The head is a sooty black, sometimes with a faint greenish sheen and brown feather bases visible; the back and side of the neck are dark grey and the underparts greyish or sooty black. The tail has narrower feathers and a greenish sheen.

There is very little geographic variation in size. The main differences are the presence or absence of a partial whitish collar at the base of the nape and variations in the colour of the nape and the tone of the underparts. Central Asian populations have slightly larger wings, while western populations have slightly heavier bills. Body colour becomes darker in mountain regions and humid climates further north, and paler elsewhere. However, individual variation, particularly in juveniles and during the months before moulting, can often exceed geographic differences.

The western jackdaw is a skilled flyer that can manoeuvre tightly, tumble and glide. It has distinctive jerky wingbeats when flying, though these are not apparent during migration. Wind tunnel experiments show that the preferred gliding speed is between 6 and 11 metres (20 and 36 ft) per second and that the wingspan decreases as the bird flies faster. On the ground, western jackdaws have an upright posture and strut briskly, their short legs giving them a rapid gait. They feed with their heads held down or horizontally.

Within its range, the western jackdaw is unmistakable; its short bill and grey nape are distinguishing features. From a distance, it can be confused with a rook (Corvus frugilegus), or when in flight, with a pigeon or chough. Flying western jackdaws are distinguishable from other corvids by their smaller size, faster and deeper wingbeats and proportionately narrower and less fingered wing tips. They also have shorter, thicker necks, much shorter bills and frequently fly in tighter flocks. They can be distinguished from choughs by their uniformly grey underwings and their black beaks and legs. The western jackdaw is very similar in morphology, behaviour, and calls to the Daurian jackdaw, with which its range overlaps in western Asia. Adults are readily distinguished, since the Daurian has a pied plumage, but immature birds are much more similar, both species having dark plumage and dark eyes. The Daurian tends to be darker, with a less contrasting nape than the Western.

=== Vocalisations ===
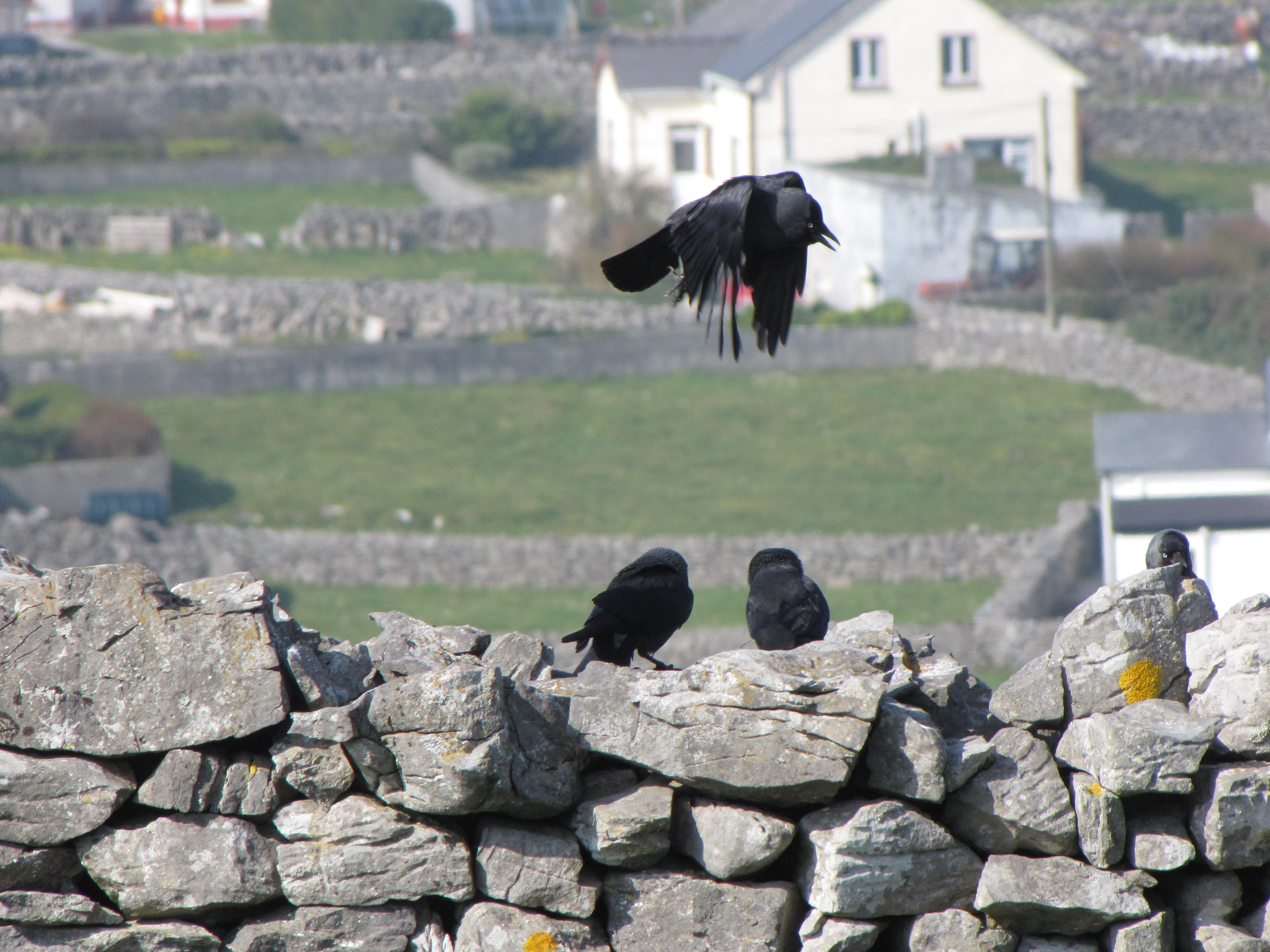
Western jackdaw calling in flight on Inisheer, Ireland

Western jackdaws are voluble birds. The main call, frequently given in flight, is a metallic and squeaky chyak-chyak or kak-kak. This is a contact or greeting call. A feeding call made by adults to call young, or males when offering food to their mates, has been transcribed as kiaw or kyow. Females in return give a more drawn out version when begging for food from males, written as kyaay, tchaayk or giaaaa. Perched birds often chatter together, and before settling for the night, large roosting flocks make a cackling noise. Western jackdaws also have a hoarse, drawn-out alarm call, arrrrr or kaaaarr, used when warning of predators or when mobbing them. Nestlings begin making a soft cheep at about a week of age. As they grow, their voice becomes louder until their call is a penetrating screech around day 18. After this, the voice deepens and softens. From day 25, the young cease calling and become silent if they hear an unfamiliar noise. The European jackdaw can be trained to imitate human speech.

== Distribution and habitat ==
The western jackdaw is found from Northwest Africa through all of Europe, except for the subarctic north, and eastwards through central Asia to the eastern Himalayas and Lake Baikal. To the east, it occurs throughout Turkey, the Caucasus, Iran, Iraq, Afghanistan, Pakistan, and northwestern India. However, it is regionally extinct in Malta and Tunisia. The range is vast, with an estimated global extent between 1 and 10 million square kilometres (0.4–4 million square miles). It has a large global population, with an estimated 15.6 to 45 million individuals in Europe alone. Censuses of bird populations in marginal uplands in Great Britain show that western jackdaws greatly increased in numbers between the 1970s and 2010, although this increase may be related to recovery from previous periods when they were regarded as pests. The UK population was estimated at 2.5 million individuals in 1998, up from 780,000 in 1970.

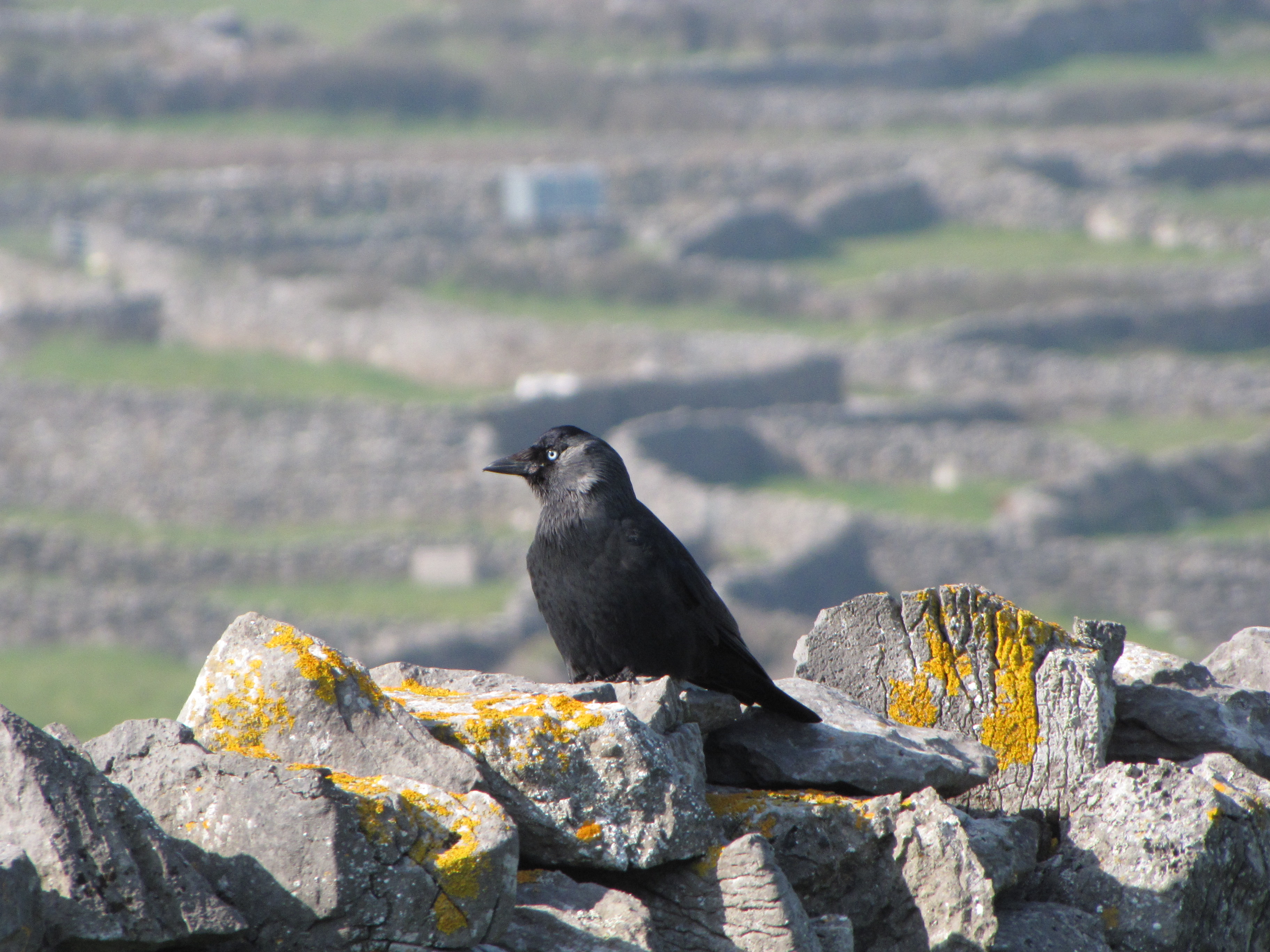
A western jackdaw on Inisheer, Ireland

Most populations are resident, but the northern and eastern populations are more migratory, relocating to wintering areas between September and November and returning between February and early May. Their range expands northwards into Russia to Siberia during summer and retracts in winter. They are vagrants to the Faroe Islands, particularly in the winter and spring, and occasionally to Iceland. Elsewhere, western jackdaws congregate over winter in the Ural Valley in northwestern Kazakhstan, the northern Caspian, and the Tian Shan region of western China. They are winter visitors to the Quetta Valley in western Pakistan, and are winter vagrants to Lebanon, where they were first recorded in 1962. In Syria, they are winter vagrants and rare residents with some confirmed breeding taking place. The subspecies soemmerringii occurs in south-central Siberia and extreme northwestern China and is accidental to Hokkaido, Japan. A small number of western jackdaws reached northeastern North America in the 1980s and have been found from Atlantic Canada to Pennsylvania. They have also occurred as vagrants in Gibraltar, Mauritania, and Saint Pierre and Miquelon, and one is reported to have been seen in Egypt.

Western jackdaws inhabit wooded steppes, pastures, cultivated land, coastal cliffs, and towns. They thrive when forested areas are cleared and converted to fields and open areas. Habitats with a mix of large trees, buildings, and open ground are preferred; open fields are left to the rook, and more wooded areas to the Eurasian jay (Garrulus glandarius). Along with other corvids such as the rook, common raven (Corvus corax), and hooded crow (C. cornix), some western jackdaws spend the winter in urban parks; populations measured in three urban parks in Warsaw show increases from October to December, possibly due to western jackdaws migrating there from areas further north. The same data from Warsaw, collected from 1977 to 2003, showed that the wintering western jackdaw population had increased four-fold. The cause of the increase is unknown, but a reduction in the number of rooks may have benefited the species locally, or rooks overwintering in Belarus may have caused western jackdaws to relocate to Warsaw.

=== Fossil record ===
Fossils of the western jackdaw are known from the Late Pleistocene, specifically MIS 3 of the Iberian Range, in a fossil assemblage believed to represent an accumulation of bones made by diurnal birds-of-prey.

== Behaviour ==
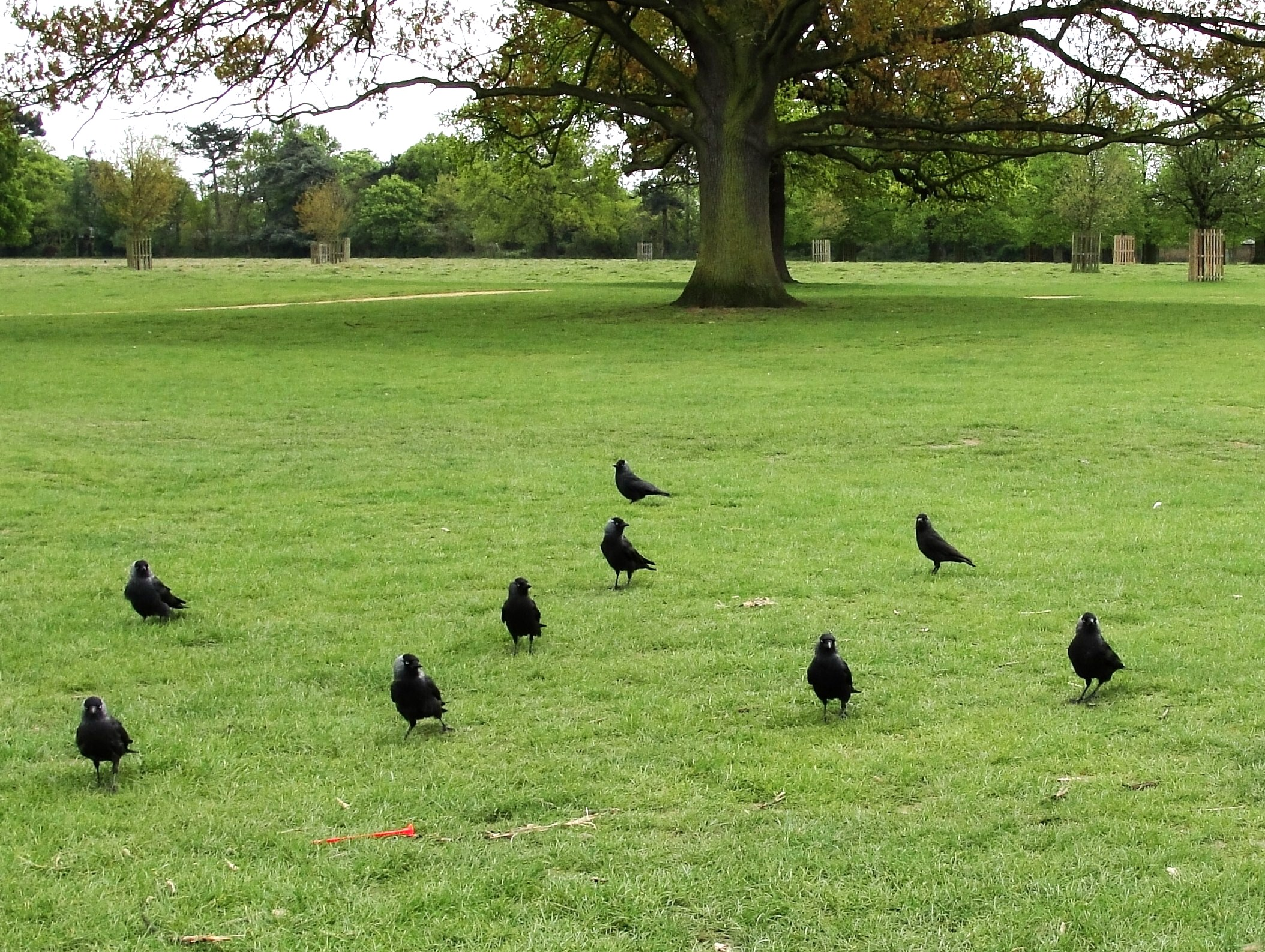
A family group in Bushy Park, London.

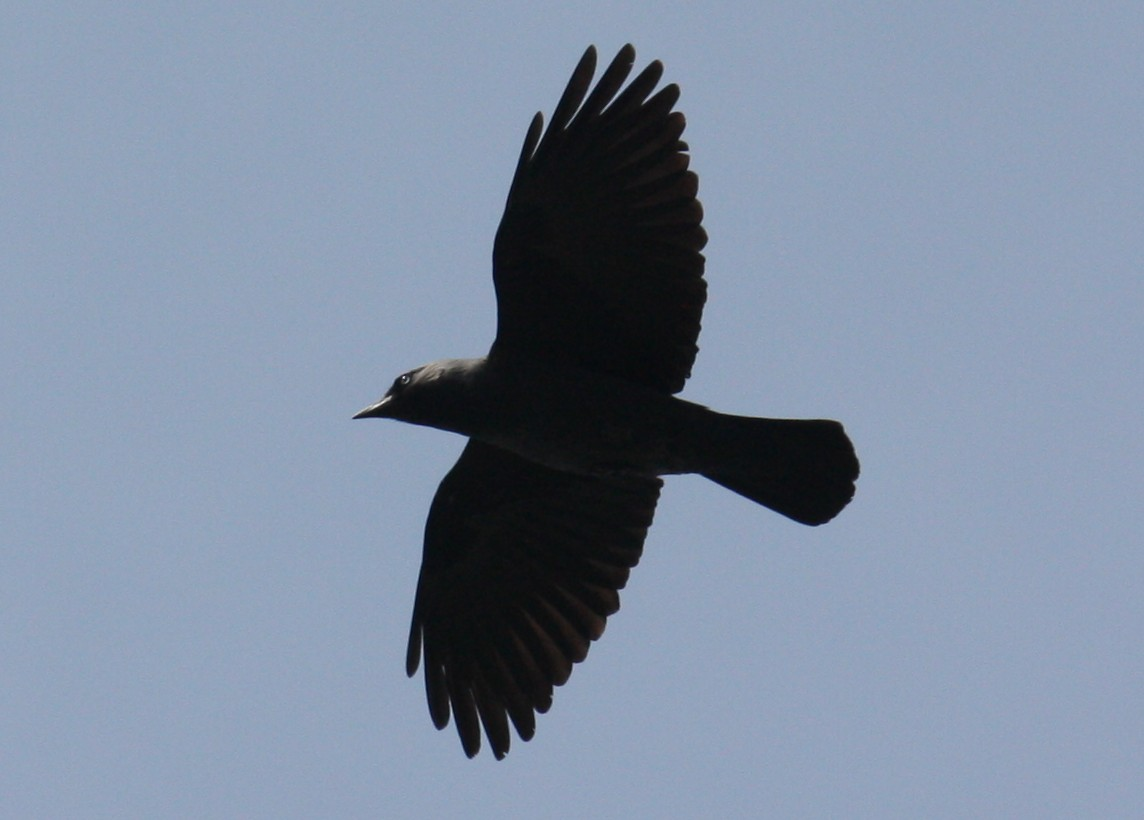
A western jackdaw in flight.

Generally wary of people in the forest or countryside, western jackdaws are much tamer in urban areas.

Highly gregarious, western jackdaws are generally seen in flocks of varying sizes, though males and females pair-bond for life and pairs stay together within flocks. Flocks increase in size in autumn and birds congregate at dusk for communal roosting, with up to several thousand individuals gathering at one site. At Uppsala, Sweden, 40,000 birds have been recorded at a single winter roost with mated pairs often settling together for the night. Western jackdaws frequently congregate with hooded crows or rooks, the latter particularly when migrating or roosting. They have been recorded foraging with the common starling (Sturnus vulgaris), Northern lapwing (Vanellus vanellus), and common gull (Larus canus) in northwestern England. Flocks are targets of coordinated hunting by pairs of lanner falcons (Falco biarmicus), although larger groups are more able to elude the predators. Western jackdaws sometimes mob and drive off larger birds such as European magpies, common ravens, or Egyptian vultures (Neophron percnopterus); one gives an alarm call which alerts its conspecifics to gather and attack as a group. Occasionally, a sick or injured western jackdaw is mobbed until it is killed.

In his book King Solomon's Ring, Konrad Lorenz described and analysed the complex social interactions in a western jackdaw flock that lived around his house in Altenberg, Austria. He ringed them for identification and caged them in the winter to prevent their annual migration. He found that the birds have a linear hierarchical group structure, with higher-ranked individuals dominating lower-ranked birds, and pair-bonded birds sharing the same rank. Young males establish their individual status before pairing with females. Upon pairing, the female assumes the same social position as her partner. Unmated females are the lowest members in the pecking order, and are the last to have access to food and shelter. Lorenz noted one case in which a male, absent during the dominance struggles and pair bondings, returned to the flock, became the dominant male, and chose one of two unpaired females for a mate. This female immediately assumed a dominant position in the social hierarchy and demonstrated this by pecking others. According to Lorenz, the most significant factor in social behaviour was the immediate and intuitive grasp of the new hierarchy by each of the western jackdaws in the flock.

=== Social displays ===
Social hierarchy in western jackdaw flocks is determined by supplanting, fighting, and threat displays—several of which have been described. In the bill-up posture, the western jackdaw tilts its bill and head upwards and sleeks its plumage. Indicating both appeasement and assertiveness, the posture is used by birds intending to enter feeding flocks. A bill-down posture is another commonly used agonistic behaviour. In this display, a bird lowers its bill and erects its nape and head feathers, and sometimes slightly lifts its wings. Western jackdaws often face off in this posture until one backs down or a fight ensues. In the forward-threat posture, a bird holds its body horizontally and thrusts its head forwards. In intense versions, the bird ruffles its feathers and spreads or raises its tail and wings. This extreme is seen when facing off over nests or females. In the defensive-threat posture, the bird lowers its head and bill, spreads its tail and ruffles its feathers. Supplanting is where one bird moves in and displaces another from a perch-site. The second bird usually retreats without resorting to a fight. Western jackdaws fight by launching themselves at each other feet-first and then wrestling with their feet intertwined and pecking at each other. Other individuals gather and call noisily.

Western jackdaws entreat their partners to preen them by showing their nape and ruffling their head feathers. Birds mainly preen each other's head and neck. Known as allopreening, this behaviour is almost always done between birds of a mated pair.

=== Breeding ===
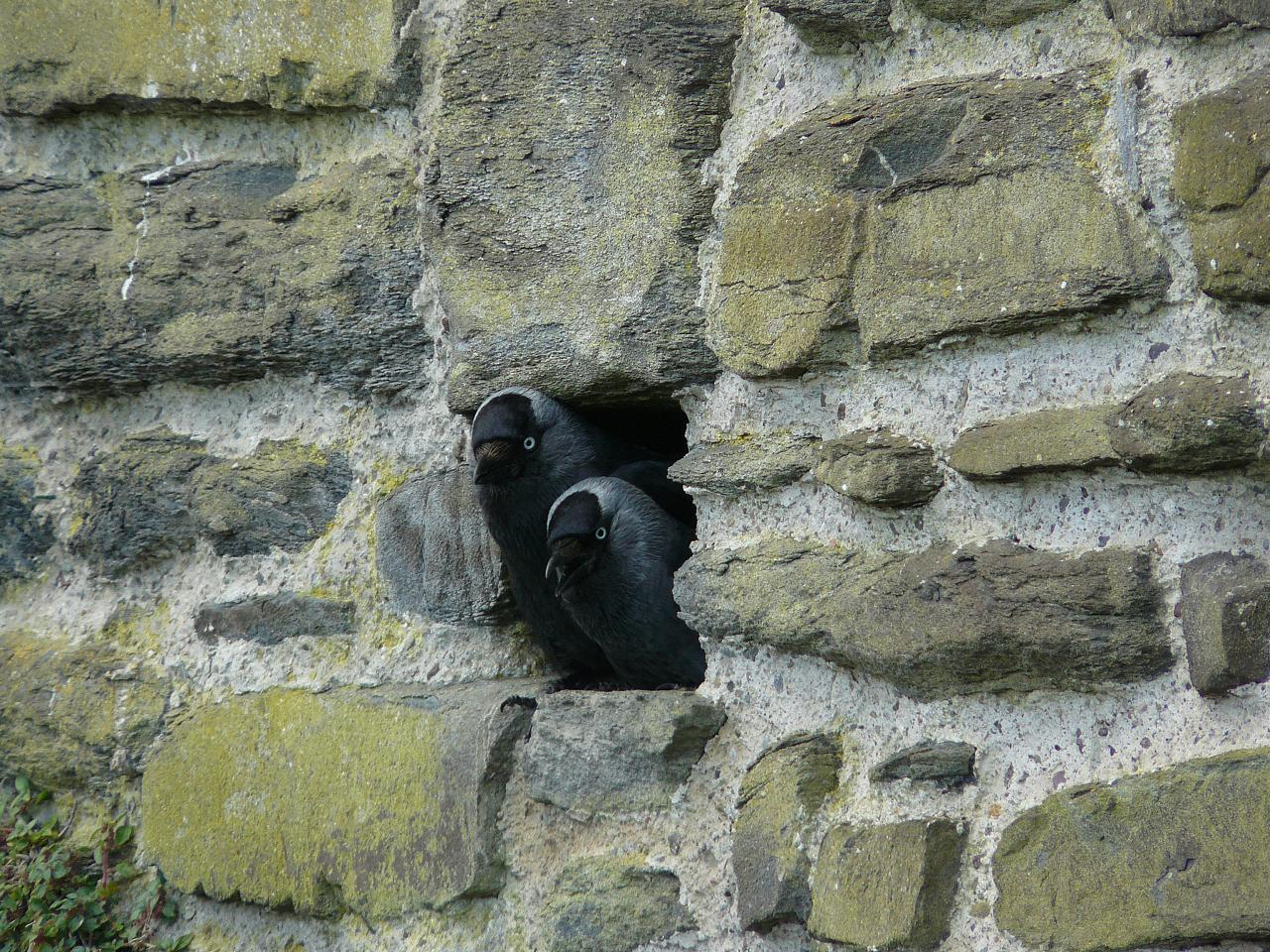
Occupying a hole in a wall at Conwy Castle, Wales.

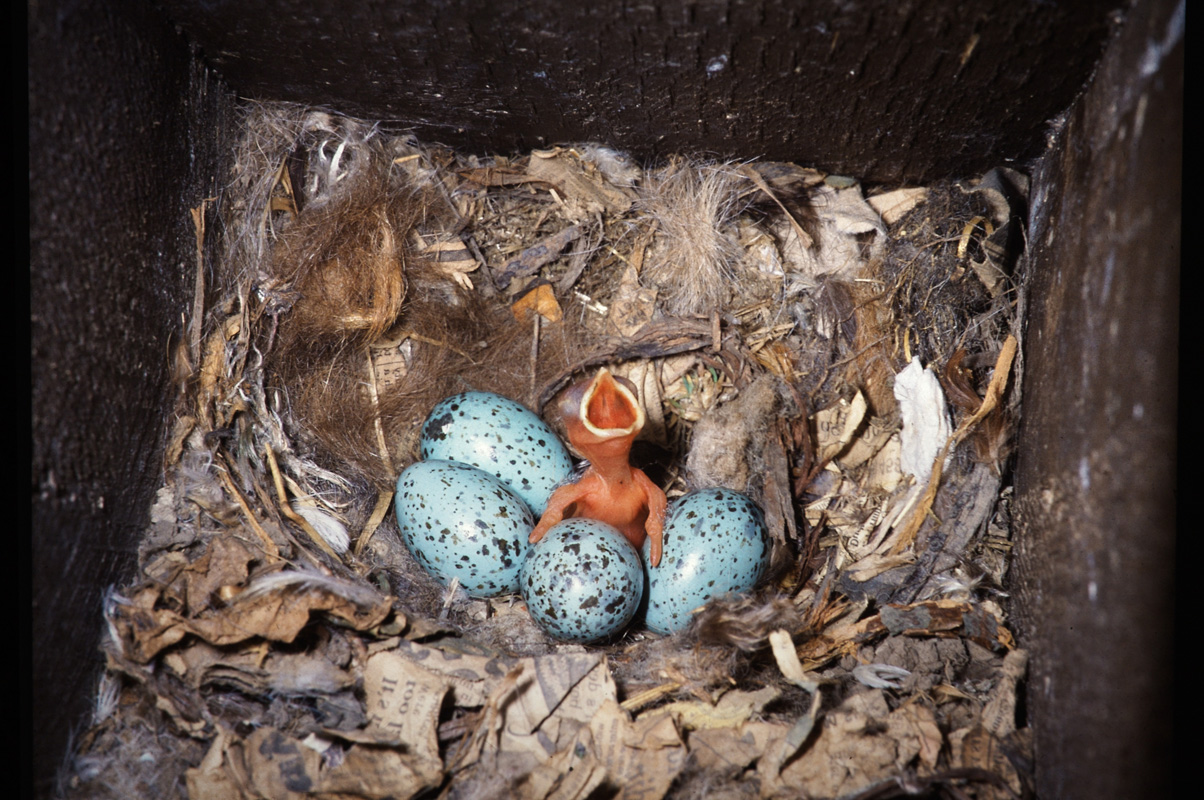
Nest with a chick and eggs.

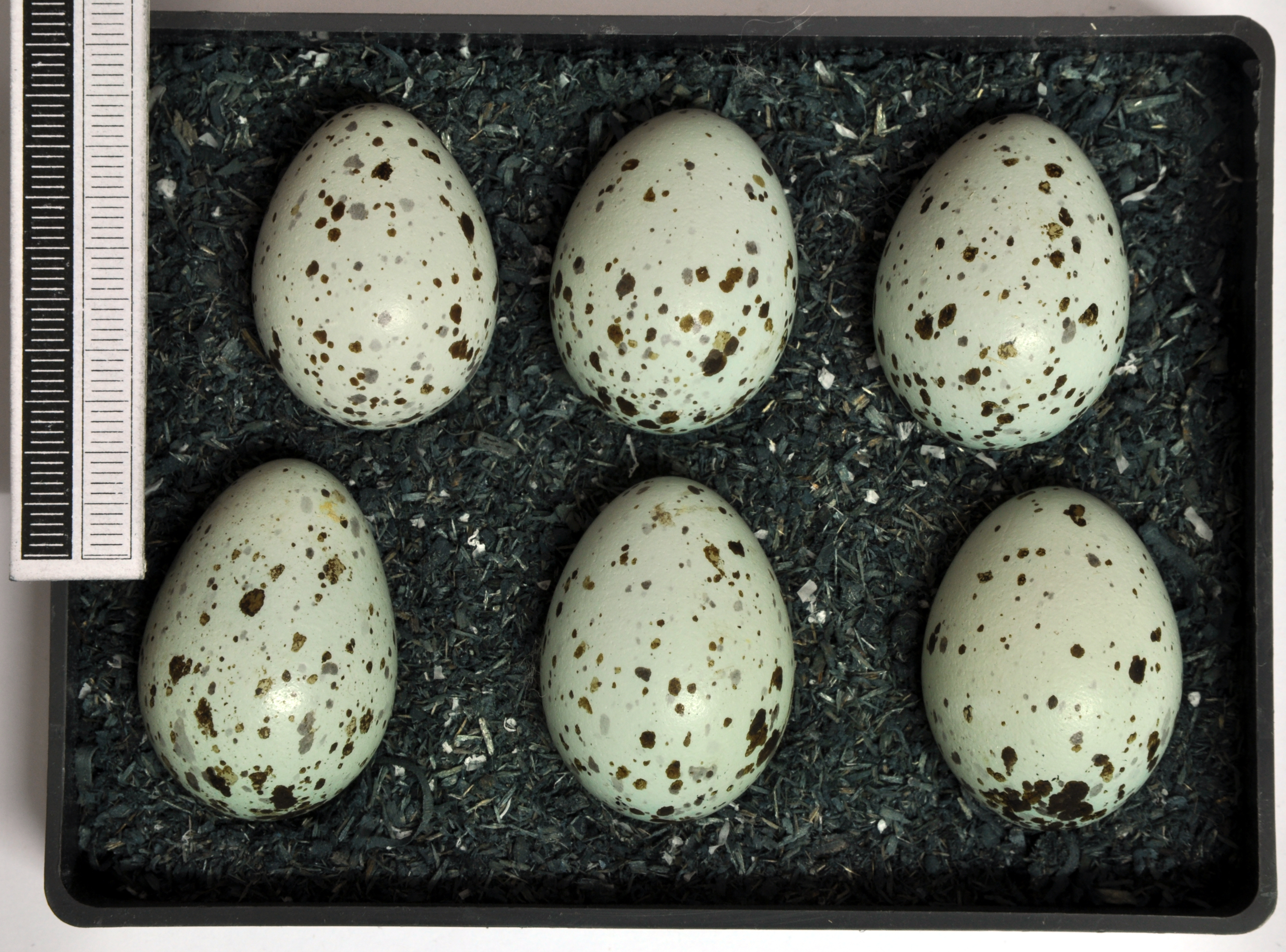
Eggs, Collection Museum Wiesbaden

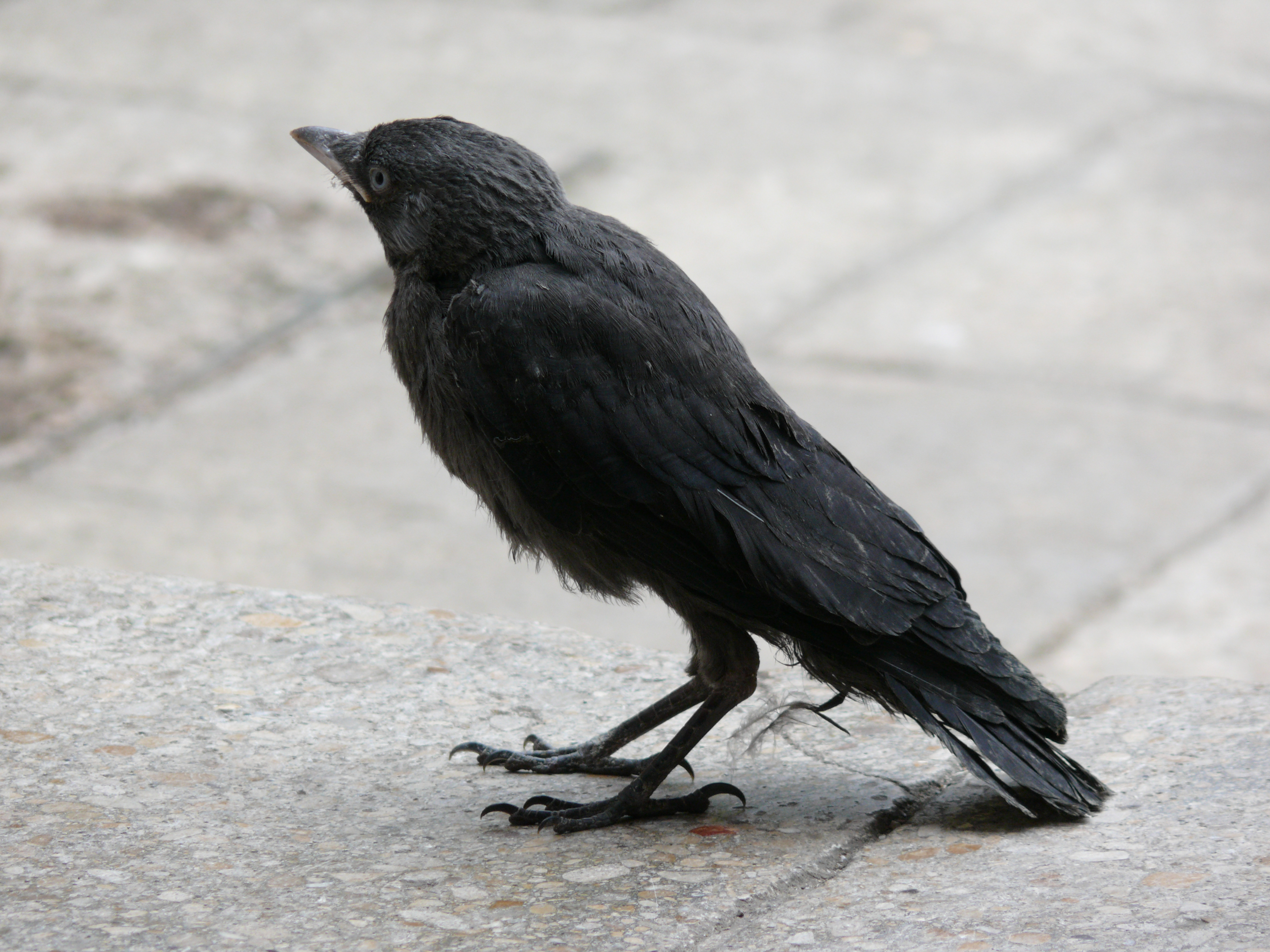
Fledgling C. m. spermologus in southern England.

Western jackdaws become sexually mature in their second year. Genetic analysis of pairs and offspring shows no evidence of extra-pair copulation and there is little evidence for couple separation even after multiple instances of reproductive failure. Some pairs do separate in the first few months, but almost all pairings of over six months' duration are lifelong, ending only when a partner dies. Widowed or separated birds fare badly, often being ousted from nests or territories and unable to rear broods alone.

Western jackdaws usually breed in colonies with pairs collaborating to find a nest site, which they then defend from other pairs and predators during most of the year. They nest in cavities in trees or cliffs, in ruined or occupied buildings and in chimneys, the common feature being a sheltered site for the nest. The availability of suitable sites influences their presence in a locale. They may also use church steeples for nesting, a fact reported in verse by 18th century English poet William Cowper:

A great frequenter of the church,
Where, bishoplike, he finds a perch,

And dormitory too.

Nest platforms can attain a great size. A mated pair usually constructs a nest by improving a crevice by dropping sticks into it; it is then built on top of the platform formed. This behaviour has led to the blocking of chimneys and even resulted in nests crashing down into fireplaces, sometimes with birds still on them.

In his The Natural History of Selborne, Gilbert White notes that western jackdaws used to nest in crevices beneath the lintels of Stonehenge, and describes an example of the bird using a rabbit burrow for nesting. The species has been recorded outcompeting the tawny owl (Strix aluco) for nest sites in the Netherlands. They can take over old nest sites of the black woodpecker (Dryocopus martius) and stock dove (Columba oenas). Breeding colonies may also edge out those of the red-billed chough, but in turn be ousted by larger corvids such as the carrion crow, rook or magpie.

Nests are lined with hair, wool, dead grass and many other materials. The eggs are a lighter colour than those of other corvids, being smooth, a glossy pale blue or blue-green with darker speckles ranging from dark brown to olive or grey-violet. Egg size and weight varies slightly between subspecies; those of subspecies monedula average 35.0 by 24.7 millimetres (1.38 in × 0.97 in) and 11.1 g (0.39 oz) in weight, those of subspecies soemmerringii 34.8 by 25.0 millimetres (1.37 in × 0.98 in) in size and 11.3 g (0.40 oz) in weight, and those of subspecies spermologus 35.0 by 25.2 millimetres (1.38 in × 0.99 in) in size and 11.5 g (0.41 oz) in weight. Clutches usually contain 4 or 5 eggs, although a Slovak study found clutch sizes ranging from 2 to 9 eggs. The eggs are incubated by the female for 17–18 days until hatching as naked altricial chicks, which are completely dependent on the adults for food. They fledge after 28–35 days, and the parents continue to feed them for another four weeks or so.

Western jackdaws hatch asynchronously and incubation begins before clutch completion, which often leads to the death of the last-hatched young. If the supply of food is low, parental investment in the brood is kept to a minimum as little energy is wasted on feeding a chick that is unlikely to survive. Replacement clutches are very rarely laid in the event of clutch failure.

The great spotted cuckoo (Clamator glandarius) has been recorded as a brood parasite of the western jackdaw, depositing its eggs in their nests in Spain and Israel. Nest robbers include the common raven in Spain, tawny owl, and least weasel (Mustela nivalis) in England, and brown rat (Rattus norvegicus) in Finland. The European pine marten (Martes martes) raids isolated nests in Sweden but is less successful when nests are part of a colony.

=== Feeding ===
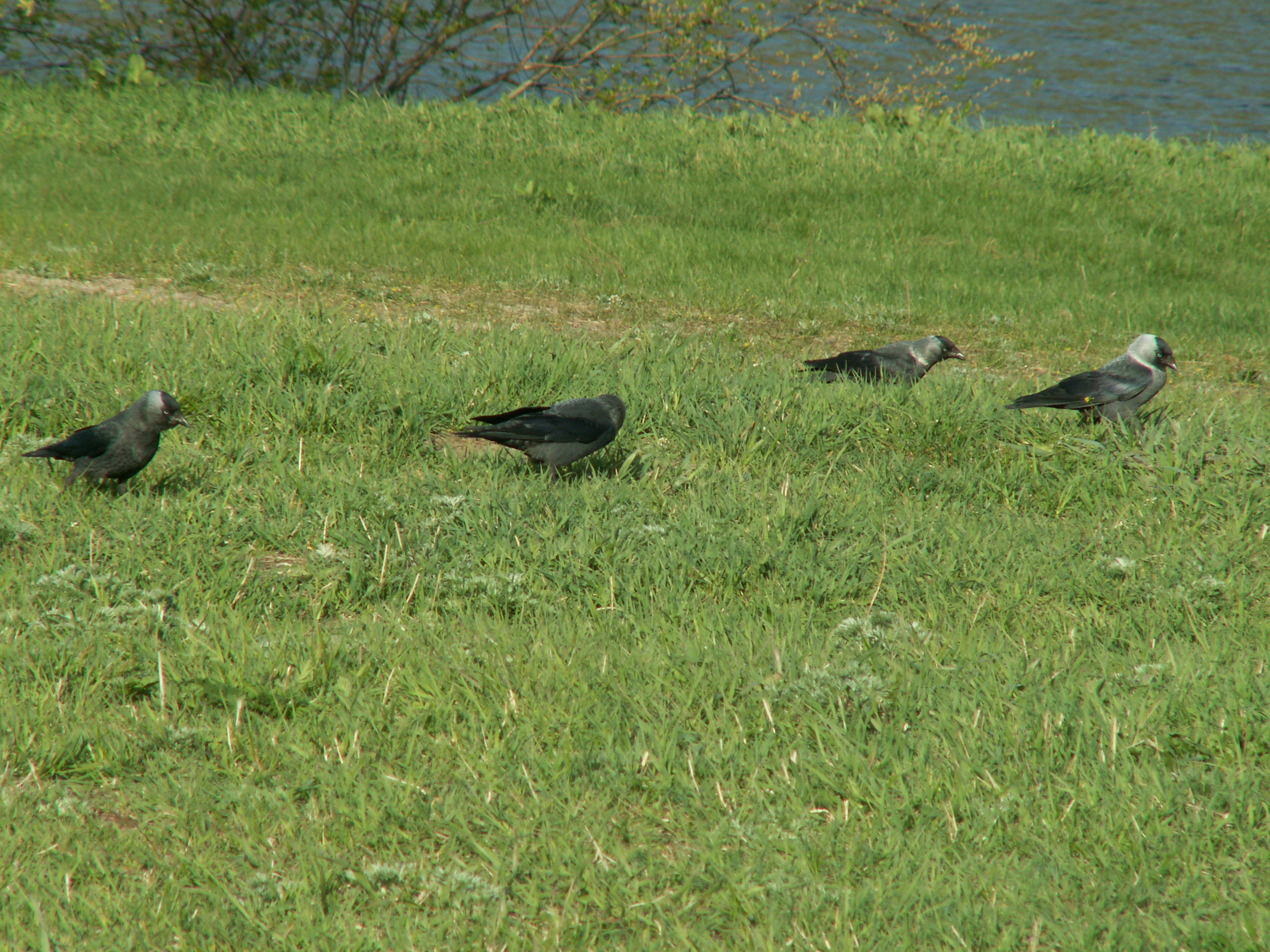
C. m. soemmerringii, foraging in pasture in Russia.

Foraging takes place mostly on the ground in open areas and to some extent in trees. Landfill sites, bins, streets, and gardens are also visited, more often early in the morning when there are fewer people about. Various feeding methods are employed, such as jumping, pecking, clod-turning and scattering, probing the soil, and occasionally, digging. Flies around cow pats are caught by jumping from the ground or at times by dropping vertically from a few metres onto the cow pat. Earthworms are not usually extracted from the ground by western jackdaws but are eaten from freshly ploughed soil. Jackdaws will ride on the backs of sheep and other mammals, seeking ticks as well as actively gathering wool or hair for nests, and will catch flying ants in flight. Compared with other corvids, the western jackdaw spends more time exploring and turning over objects with its bill; it also has a straighter and less downturned bill and increased binocular vision which are advantageous for this foraging strategy.

The western jackdaw tends to feed on small invertebrates up to 18 millimetres (0.71 in) in length that are found above ground, including various species of beetle (particularly cockchafers of the genus Melolontha, and weevil larvae and pupae.), Diptera, and Lepidoptera species, as well as snails and spiders. Also eaten are small rodents, bats, the eggs and chicks of birds, and carrion such as roadkill. Vegetable items consumed include farm grains (barley, wheat and oats), weed seeds, elderberries, acorns, and various cultivated fruits. Examination of the gizzards of western jackdaws shot in Cyprus in spring and summer revealed a diet of cereals (predominantly wheat) and insects (notably cicadas and beetles). The diet averages 84% plant material except when breeding, when the main food source is insects. A study in southern Spain examining western jackdaw pellets found that they contained significant amounts of silicaceous and calcareous grit to aid digestion of vegetable food and supply dietary calcium.

Opportunistic and highly adaptable, the western jackdaw varies its diet markedly depending on available food sources. They have been recorded taking eggs and nestlings from the nests of the skylark (Alauda arvensis), Manx shearwater (Puffinus puffinus), razorbill (Alca torda), common guillemot (Uria aalge), grey heron (Ardea cinerea), rock dove (Columba livia), and Eurasian collared dove (Streptopelia decaocto). A field study of a large city dump on the outskirts of León in northwestern Spain showed that western jackdaws forage there in the early morning and at dusk, and engage in some degree of kleptoparasitism. The saker falcon (Falco cherrug) has been reported stealing food from western jackdaws on powerlines in Vojvodina in Serbia.

Western jackdaws practice active food sharing – where the initiative for the transfer lies with the donor – with a number of individuals, regardless of sex or kinship. They also share more of a preferred food than a less preferred food. The active giving of food by most birds is found mainly in the context of parental care and courtship. Western jackdaws show much higher levels of active giving than has been documented for other species, including chimpanzees. The function of this behaviour is not fully understood, though it has been found to be detached from nutrition and compatible with hypotheses of mutualism, reciprocity and harassment avoidance. It has also been proposed that food sharing may be motivated by prestige enhancement.

== Parasites and diseases ==
Western jackdaws have learned to peck open the foil caps of milk bottles left on the doorsteps after delivery by the milkman. The bacterium Campylobacter jejuni has been isolated from their beaks and cloacae so milk can become contaminated as they drink. This activity was linked to cases of Campylobacter gastroenteritis in Gateshead in northeast England and led the Department of Health to suggest that milk from bottles which had been pecked open should be discarded. It was recommended that steps be taken to prevent birds from pecking bottles open in the future.

An outbreak of a gastrointestinal illness in Spain which was causing mortalities in humans has been linked to western jackdaws. During a post-mortem on an affected bird, a polyomavirus was isolated from the spleen. The illness appeared to be a co-infection of this with Salmonella and the virus has been provisionally named the crow polyomavirus (CPyV). Segmented filamentous bacteria have been isolated from the small intestine of a western jackdaw, although their pathogenicity or role is unknown.

== Pest control ==
The western jackdaw has been hunted as a pest, though not as heavily culled as other species of corvid. After a series of poor harvests in the early 1500s, Henry VIII introduced a Vermin Act in 1532 "ordeyned to dystroye Choughes (i.e. jackdaws), Crowes and Rokes" to protect grain crops from their predations. Western jackdaws were notorious for their fondness for fruit, especially cherries. This act was adopted piecemeal, but Elizabeth I passed the Act for the Preservation of Grayne in 1566 which was enforced more vigorously. The species was hunted for threatening grain crops and for propensity for nesting in belfries until the mid-20th century. Particularly large numbers were culled in the county of Norfolk. Western jackdaws were also culled on game estates for raiding the nests of other birds for eggs. In a 2003 dissertation on public opinion of corvids, Antonia Hereth notes that the German naturalist Alfred Brehm considered the western jackdaw to be a lovable bird, and did not attribute any negative impacts of to this species with regard to agriculture.

The western jackdaw is one of a very small number of birds that can legally be used as decoys or trapped in cages in the United Kingdom. The other pest species that can be controlled by trapping are the crow, jay, magpie and rook. An authorised person does not need to prove that the birds were a nuisance before trapping them, but must comply with the provisions of the Wildlife and Countryside Act 1981. As of 2003, the western jackdaw was listed as a potential species for targeted hunting in the European Union Birds Directive, and hunting has been encouraged by German hunting associations. Permission to shoot western jackdaws in spring and summer exists in Cyprus, despite them not preying on gamebirds as is commonly believed.

== Cultural depictions and folklore ==
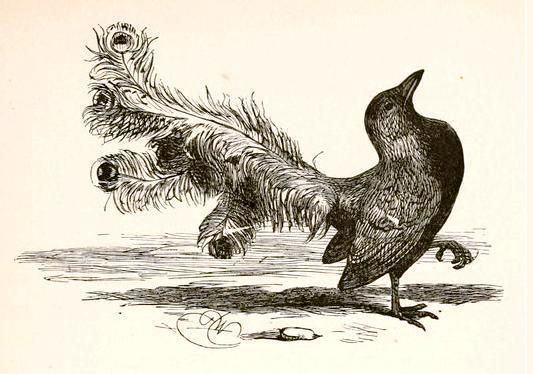
Harrison Weir's 1881 illustration of a vain jackdaw wearing peacock feathers for "The Bird in Borrowed Feathers" (also known as "The Vain Jackdaw") fable

A jackdaw pictured in the coat of arms of the Sauvo municipality

In The Birds by Aristophanes, Euelpides speaks to his jackdaw in the first line of the play. An ancient Greek and Roman adage runs "The swans will sing when the jackdaws are silent", meaning that wise or educated people will only speak once the foolish have become quiet. In Ancient Greek folklore, a jackdaw can be caught with a dish of oil. A narcissistic creature, it falls in while looking at its own reflection. The mythical Princess Arne Sithonis was bribed with gold by King Minos of Crete, and was punished by the gods for her greed by being transformed into an equally avaricious jackdaw, who still seeks shiny things. The Roman poet Ovid described jackdaws as harbingers of rain in his poetic work Amores. Pliny notes how the Thessalians, Illyrians, and Lemnians cherished jackdaws for destroying grasshoppers' eggs. The Veneti are fabled to have bribed the jackdaws to spare their crops.

In some cultures, the presence of a jackdaw on a roof is said to predict a new arrival. Alternatively, if a jackdaw settles on the roof of a house or flies down a chimney, it is considered an omen of death. Encountering a jackdaw is also an ill omen. A jackdaw standing on the vanes of a cathedral tower is said to foretell rain. The 12th-century historian William of Malmesbury records the story of a woman who, upon hearing a jackdaw chattering "more loudly than usual," grew pale and became fearful of suffering a "dreadful calamity", and that "while yet speaking, the messenger of her misfortunes arrived". Czech superstition formerly held that if jackdaws are seen quarreling, war will follow, and that jackdaws will not build nests at Sázava after being banished by Saint Procopius.

The jackdaw was considered sacred in Welsh folklore as it nested in church steeples – it was shunned by the Devil because of its choice of residence. Nineteenth century belief in the Fens held that seeing a jackdaw on the way to a wedding was a good omen for a bride.

The jackdaw is featured on the Ukrainian town of Halych's ancient coat of arms, the town's name allegedly being derived from the East Slavic word for the bird. In The Book of Laughter and Forgetting (1979), Milan Kundera notes that Franz Kafka's father Hermann had a sign in front of his shop with a jackdaw painted next to his name, since "kavka" means jackdaw in Czech.

Coat of arms of the Principality of Halych

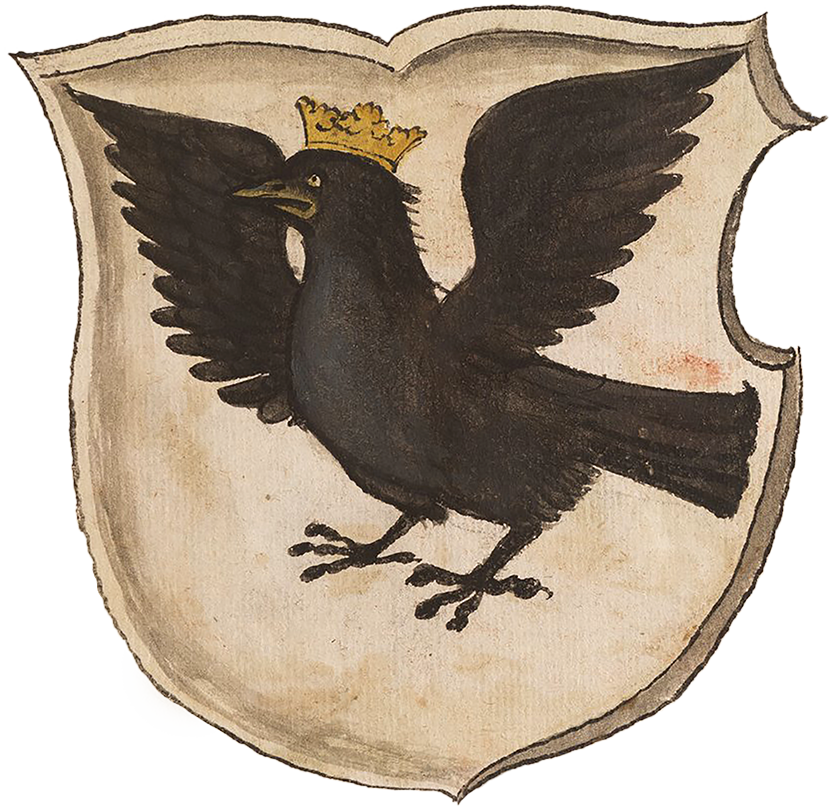
Coat of arms of Halych Land

Flag of Halych land at the Battle of Grunwald 1410

Coat of arms of Ivano-Frankivsk Oblast
