= Hippius (surname) =

Hippius is a surname associated with the noble Baltic German Hippius family. Its Russian spelling is Gippius. Notable people with the surname include:

- Gustav Adolf Hippius
- Karl Gustav Hippius
- Leontine Hippius
- Natalia Gippius
- Otto Pius Hippius
- Rudolf Hippius
- Zinaida Gippius
