= 1974 in science =

The year 1974 in science and technology involved some significant events, listed below.

== Astronomy and space exploration ==
- February 8 – After 84 days in space, the last crew of the temporary American space station Skylab return to Earth.
- February 13–15 – Sagittarius A*, thought to be the location of a supermassive black hole, is identified by Bruce Balick and Robert Brown using the baseline interferometer of the United States National Radio Astronomy Observatory.
- November 16 – Arecibo message transmitted from Arecibo Observatory (Puerto Rico) to Messier 13.
- Hawking radiation is predicted by Stephen Hawking.

== Computer Science ==
- The Mark-8 microcomputer based on the Intel 8008 microprocessor is designed by Jonathan Titus. It is announced on the cover of the July 1974 issue of Radio-Electronics as "Your Personal Minicomputer".

== History of science ==
- F. W. Winterbotham publishes The Ultra secret: the inside story of Operation Ultra, Bletchley Park and Enigma, the first popular account of cryptography carried out at Bletchley Park during World War II.

== Mathematics ==
- Yves Hellegouarch proposes a connection between Fermat's Last Theorem and the Frey curve.

== Medicine ==
- September 25 – 1974 – The first "Tommy John surgery" for replacement of ulnar collateral ligament of elbow joint is performed by Frank Jobe in the United States.
- Identification of controlled trials in perinatal medicine, as advocated by Archie Cochrane, begins in Cardiff, Wales.
- Henry Heimlich describes the "Heimlich Maneuver" as a treatment for choking.

== Paleoanthropology and paleontology ==
- November 24 – A group of paleoanthropologists discover remains of a 3.2-million-year-old skeleton of an Australopithecus afarensis in the Afar Depression of Ethiopia, nicknaming her "Lucy".

== Physics ==
- May 18 – "Smiling Buddha", India's first nuclear test explosion takes place underground at Pokhran.
- "November Revolution": J/ψ meson, the first particle found to contain a charm quark, discovered by teams at the Brookhaven National Laboratory, led by Samuel Ting, and at the Stanford Linear Accelerator Center, led by Burton Richter.

== Physiology ==
- May – British neuroscientists John Hughes and Hans Kosterlitz announce their isolation of the peptides met- and leu-enkephalin.

== Psychology ==
- Civilized Man's Eight Deadly Sins is published by Konrad Lorenz.
- Leon Kamin demonstrates that Sir Cyril Burt's influential research into heritability of IQ using twin studies shows evidence of statistical falsification.

== Technology ==
- June 26 – The Universal Product Code is scanned for the first time, to sell a package of Wrigley's chewing gum at the Marsh Supermarket in Troy, Ohio, the first use of barcode technology in American retailing.
- Stephen Salter invents the "Salter Duck", a wave energy converter.

== Zoology ==
- January 7 – Outbreak of 4-year Gombe Chimpanzee War in Tanzania, reported by Jane Goodall.
- Digital dermatitis in cattle identified in Italy by Cheli and Mortellaro.

== Other events ==
- Rubik's Cube invented by Ernő Rubik.

== Awards ==
- Fields Prize in Mathematics: Enrico Bombieri and David Mumford
- Nobel Prizes
  - Physics – Martin Ryle, Antony Hewish
  - Chemistry – Paul J. Flory
  - Medicine – Albert Claude, Christian de Duve, George Emil Palade
- Turing Award – Donald Knuth

== Births ==
- March 10 – Biz Stone, American computing entrepreneur
- August 8 – Manjul Bhargava, Canadian-born mathematician
- August 11 – Sarah-Jayne Blakemore, English cognitive neuroscientist
- September 28 – Sunil Kumar Verma, Indian biologist

== Deaths ==
- February 4 – S. N. Bose, Indian physicist (b. 1894)
- April 12 – Cornelis Simon Meijer, Dutch mathematician (b. 1904)
- May 4 – Ludwig Koch, German-born British animal sound recordist (b. 1881)
- May 18 – Harry Ricardo, English mechanical engineer (b. 1885)
- May 22 – Irmgard Flügge-Lotz (b. 1903), German-American mathematician and aerospace engineer
- June 28 – Vannevar Bush, American science administrator (b. 1890)
- July 3 – Sergey Lebedev, Soviet Russian computer scientist (b. 1902)
- August 22 – Jacob Bronowski, Polish-born British scientific polymath (b. 1908)
