= The Waning of Humaneness =

1983 book by Konrad Lorenz

- Author: Konrad Lorenz
- Original title: Der Abbau des Menschlichen
- Translator: Robert Warren Kickert
- Language: German
- Subject: technocracy
- Publisher: Piper Verlag
- Publication date: 1983
- Publication place: West Germany
- English publication date: 1987
- Pages: 293
- ISBN: 3492028330

The Waning of Humaneness (German: Der Abbau des Menschlichen) is a 1983 book by the Austrian zoologist Konrad Lorenz.

== Summary ==
The book is an analysis of increasing artificiality under technocratic rule, where Lorenz did not see any major distinction between capitalist and totalitarian systems. The arguments are underpinned by studies in animal behaviour. Lorenz identified an in-built human tendency to improve cultural structures, which, under technocracy, can go to extremes and remove the meaning and adaptivity in things such as specialization and functionality. Lorenz suggested increased contact with nature, especially for young people, as a possible antidote to the destructive sides of technocracy.

== Reception ==
In The Cambridge Quarterly, John Holloway wrote that The Waning of Humaneness is a more extensive treatment of the same subjects as Lorenz' previous book Civilized Man's Eight Deadly Sins, and that this element of repetition is the only thing that may prevent it from being "a book of outstanding importance". Publishers Weekly described the book as a "stiffly written jeremiad" and its prescribed remedy as anticlimactic, but wrote that it stands out due to its basis in animal studies.
