= Man Meets Dog =

1949 book by Konrad Lorenz

- First edition
- Author: Konrad Lorenz
- Original title: Verlag G. Borotha-Schoeler
- Language: German
- Genre: Non-fiction
- Publisher: Verlag G. Borotha-Schoeler
- Publication date: 1949

So Kam de Mensch auf den Hund is a 1949 zoological book for the general audience, written by the Austrian scientist Konrad Lorenz. The first English-language edition, Man Meets Dog, was published in 1954. The book includes drawings from the author.

The original German title, So kam der Mensch auf den Hund, could be literally translated as "How man ended up with dog". The German title is also a play on the phrase "Auf den Hund kommen", which is a common idiom in German-speaking countries and probably comes from the old days when farmers with economic problems had to sell their livestock animals and ended up with only the dog.

The opening chapter, "How it may have started", deals with theories concerning the question where and when man first domesticated the predecessor of the modern dog. The book has a lot of interesting anecdotes of the author's experiences with dogs, these stories are often illustrated with simple drawings. Lorenz usually owned several dogs and many other animals and lived with them in his house near Vienna. There are also many insights into the behavior of cats and birds, though the focus is on the behavior of dogs.
