= Behind the Mirror =

1973 philosophy book by Konrad Lorenz

- Cover of the first edition
- Author: Konrad Lorenz
- Original title: Die Rückseite des Spiegels
- Language: German
- Published: 1973
- Publication place: Austria
- Media type: Print (hardcover)
- Pages: 261

Behind the Mirror: A Search for a Natural History of Human Knowledge (German: Die Rückseite des Spiegels, Versuch einer Naturgeschichte menschlichen Erkennens) is a 1973 book by the ethologist Konrad Lorenz. Lorenz shows the essentials of a lifetime's work and summarizes it into his very own philosophy: evolution is the process of growing perception of the outer world by living nature itself. Stepping from simple to higher organized organisms he shows how they benefit from information processing. The methods mirrored by organs have been created in the course of evolution as the natural history of this organism. Lorenz uses the mirror as a simplified model of our brain reflecting the part of information from the outside world it is able to "see". The backside of the mirror was created by evolution to gather as much information as needed to better survive. The book gives a hypothesis how consciousness was "invented" by evolution.

One of the key positions of the book included the criticism of Immanuel Kant, arguing that the philosopher failed to realize that knowledge, as mirrored by the human mind is the product of evolutionary adaptations.

Kant has maintained that our consciousness or our description and judgments about the world could never mirror the world as it really is so we can not simply take in the raw data that the world provides nor impose our forms on the world. Lorenz disputed this, saying it is inconceivable that - through chance mutations and selective retention - the world fashioned an instrument of cognition that grossly misleads man about such world. He said that we can determine the reliability of the mirror by looking behind it.

== Summary ==
Lorenz summarizes his life's work into his own philosophy: Evolution is the process of growing perception of the outer world by living nature itself. Stepping from simple to higher organized organisms, Lorenz shows how they gain and benefit from information. The methods mirrored by organs have been created in the course of evolution as the natural history of this organism.

In the book, Lorenz uses the mirror as a simple model of the human brain that reflects the part of the stream of information from the outside world it is able to "see". He argued that merely looking outward into the mirror ignores the fact that the mirror has a non-reflecting side, which is also a part and parcel of reality. The backside of the mirror was created by evolution to gather as much information as needed to better survive. The picture in the mirror is what we see within our mind. Within our cultural evolution we have extended this picture in the mirror by inventing instruments that transform the most needed of the invisible to something visible.

The back side of the mirror is acting for itself as it processes the incoming information to improve speed and effectiveness. By that human inventions like logical conclusions are always in danger to be manipulated by these hardwired prejudices in our brain. The book gives a hypothesis how consciousness was invented by evolution.

== Main topics ==
- Fulguratio, the flash of lightning, denotes the act of creation of a totally new talent of a system, created by the combination of two other systems with talents much less than those of the new system. The book shows the "invention" of a feedback loop by this process.
- Imprinting, is the phase-sensitive learning of an individual that is not reversible. It's a static program run only once.
- Habituation is the learning method to distinguish important information from unimportant by analysing its frequency of occurrence and its impact.
- Conditioning by reinforcement, occurs when an event following a response causes an increase in the probability of that response occurring in the future. The ability to do this kind of learning is hardwired in our brain and is based on the principle of causality. The discovery of causality (which is a substantial element of science and Buddhism) was a major step of evolution in analysing the outer world.
- Pattern matching is the abstraction of different appearances into the identification of being one object and is available only in highly organized creatures
- Exploratory behaviour is the urge of the highest developed creatures on earth to go on with learning after maturity and leads to self-exploration which is the base for consciousness.

== See also ==
- Evolutionary Epistemology
- Karl Popper
