= Arthromitus =

Scientific classification (Candidatus)
- Domain: Bacteria
- Phylum: Bacillota
- Class: Clostridia
- Order: incertae sedis
- Family: incertae sedis
- Genus: "Ca. Arthromitus" Leidy 1849

Type species
- "Arthromitus cristatus" Leidy 1849

Species
- "A. batrachorum"; "A. chasei"; "A. cristatus"; "A. intestinalis"; "A. reticulitermitidis"; "A. zootermopsidis"

Synonyms
- "Ca. Arthromitus" Snel et al. 1995; "Entomitus" Grassé 1924; "Ca. Neoarthromitus" corrig. Snel et al. 1995

Species of bacterium

Candidatus Arthromitus is a group of morphologically distinct filamentous bacteria found almost exclusively in terrestrial arthropods. They were first discovered in the guts of insects by Joseph Leidy. Despite their morphological similarity to the genus Anisomitus or segmented filamentous bacteria, they form a distinct lineage within the Lachnospiraceae.

== History ==
References to Arthromitus date back to 1849, when they were first observed by renowned physician and naturalist Joseph Leidy, who named the organisms Arthromitus (from Greek Arthro-, joint + mitos, thread). The filamentous morphology of the original Arthromitus was thought to be so unique that similar filaments observed in the vertebrate guts were erroneously placed under the division Candidatus Arthromitus. However, 16S rRNA-based phylogeny revealed the Arthromitus filaments, first observed by Leidy in arthropod guts, to belong to a group within the Lachnospiraceae, making them quite distant from previously observed filamentous organisms from vertebrate guts. These isomorphic bacteria from vertebrates were provisionally named Candidatus Savagella and later validly published as the genus Anisomitus. A poorly designed set of experiments aimed at isolating Arthromitus from termite guts led to the conclusion that Arthromitus is in fact a growth stage of Bacillus cereus. This mistaken finding was later disproved when the true identity of Arthromitus was confirmed.

== Distribution ==
Members belonging to Candidatus Arthromitus, have been observed in many arthropods including millipedes, beetle larvae, cockroaches and termites, as filamentous bacterial forms associated often with the gut wall.

== Morphology ==
As the name suggests, arthromiti have clearly identifiable, sometimes multiple segmented filamentous forms in an insect host, the existence of non-filamentous forms/stages however, cannot be ruled out. They are often found to be associated with other epibionts but the nature of this association is still unknown.

== Taxonomy ==
The 16S rRNA gene sequences of picked arthromitus filaments shows them to form a diverse but closely related group of arthropod-derived sequences within the Lachnospiraceae. The cluster lies close to Clostridium piliforme. Although members of Candidatus Arthromitus share morphological traits with members of the genus Anisomitus, they are quite phylogenetically distant and their filamentous morphology may be just an example of convergent evolution.

== See also ==
- List of bacterial orders
- List of bacteria genera
