= Segmented filamentous bacteria =

Scientific classification (Candidatus)
- Domain: Bacteria
- Kingdom: Bacillati
- Phylum: Bacillota
- Class: Clostridia
- Order: Eubacteriales
- Family: Clostridiaceae
- Genus: Candidatus Savagella; Thompson et al. 2012 non Foerste 1920 non Geis 1932

Type species
- "Ca. Savagella gallinara" Gilroy et al. 2021

Species
- "Ca. S. gallinara"

Synonyms
- "Ca. Dwaynia" Thompson et al. 2012 corrig. Oren et al. 2017; Dwaynesavagella Thompson et al. 2012 corrig. Oren et al. 2020

Type of bacteria

Segmented filamentous bacteria (SFB) are members of the gut microbiota of mammals, fish, and birds, and have been shown to potently induce immune responses in mice. They have a distinct morphology and form their own clade within the Clostridiaceae. The SFB genus is known as Anisomitus, for "uneven thread", with A. miae as the nomenclature type (seqco.de/r:zlg3gn05).

Previously, the name Candidatus Savagella was proposed for this lineage after they had been referred to as Candidatus Arthromitus due to their morphological resemblance to bacterial filaments previously observed in the guts of insects by Joseph Leidy.

Despite the fact that they have been widely referred to as segmented filamentous bacteria, this term is somewhat problematic as it does not allow one to distinguish between different bacterial species that colonize various hosts. In mice, these bacteria grow primarily in the terminal ileum in close proximity to the intestinal epithelium where they are thought to help induce T helper 17 cell responses. Mouse studies indicate SFB-induced Th17 cells can convert to Th1-like cells, enhancing anti-PD-1 tumor control against tumors sharing an SFB antigen.

Intriguingly, Segmented Filamentous Bacteria were found to expand in AID-deficient mice, which lack the ability to mount an appropriate humoral immune response because of impaired somatic hypermutation; parabiotic experiments revealed the importance of IgA in eliminating Segmented Filamentous Bacteria. This goes hand in hand with an earlier study demonstrating the ability of monocolonization with Segmented Filamentous Bacteria to dramatically increase mucosal IgA levels. Segmented Filamentous Bacteria are species specific, and may be important to immune development.

== See also ==
- List of bacteria genera
- List of bacterial orders
