= Hippios =

Hippios or Hippius may refer to:

- Poseidon, rendered as a horse
- Kolonos Hippios, a deme of Attica
- Hippios (mythology), the son of Eurynomus
- Hippios (running race), a foot race in the Nemean Games of Ancient Greece

== See also ==
- Hippias (disambiguation)
- Hippo (disambiguation)
- Hippius
