= Konrad Lorenz =

Austrian zoologist (1903–1989)

Konrad Lorenz ForMemRS
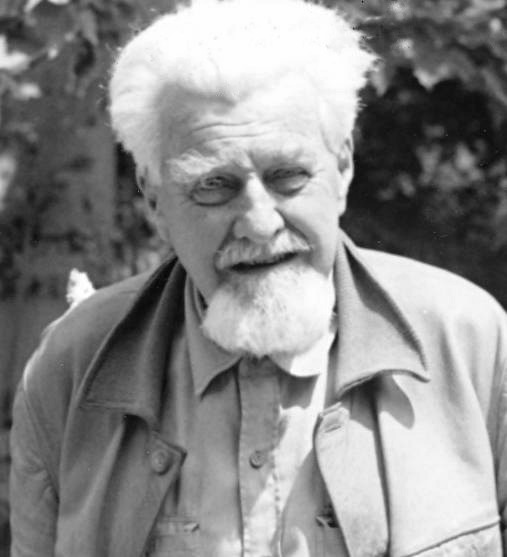
- Lorenz in 1978
- Born: Konrad Zacharias Lorenz; 7 November 1903; Vienna, Austria-Hungary
- Died: 27 February 1989 (aged 85); Vienna, Austria
- Education: Columbia University; University of Vienna (MD, PhD)
- Awards: Kalinga Prize (1969); Nobel Prize in Physiology or Medicine (1973)
- Scientific career
- Fields: Ethology

Konrad Zacharias Lorenz (Austrian German: [ˈkɔnraːd tsaxaˈriːas ˈloːrɛnts]; 7 November 1903 – 27 February 1989) was an Austrian zoologist, ethologist, and ornithologist. He shared the 1973 Nobel Prize in Physiology or Medicine with Nikolaas Tinbergen and Karl von Frisch. He is often regarded as one of the founders of modern ethology, the study of animal behavior. He developed an approach that began with an earlier generation, including his teacher Oskar Heinroth.

Lorenz studied instinctive behavior in animals, especially in greylag geese and jackdaws. Working with geese, he investigated the principle of imprinting, the process by which some nidifugous birds (i.e. birds that leave their nest early) bond instinctively with the first moving object that they see within the first hours of hatching. Although Lorenz did not discover the topic, he became widely known for his descriptions of imprinting as an instinctive bond. In 1936, he met Tinbergen, and the two collaborated in developing ethology as a separate sub-discipline of biology. A Review of General Psychology survey, published in 2002, ranked Lorenz the 65th most cited scholar of the 20th century in the technical psychology journals, introductory psychology textbooks, and survey responses.

Lorenz's work was interrupted by the onset of World War II, and in 1941 he was recruited into the German Army as a medic. In 1944, he was sent to the Eastern Front, where he was captured by the Soviet Red Army and spent four years as a German prisoner of war in Soviet Armenia. After the war, he regretted his membership in the Nazi Party.

Lorenz wrote numerous books, some of which, such as King Solomon's Ring, On Aggression, and Man Meets Dog, became popular reading. His last work Here I Am – Where Are You? is a summary of his life's work and focuses on his famous studies of greylag geese.

== Biography ==
Lorenz was the son of Adolf Lorenz, a wealthy and distinguished surgeon, and his wife Emma (née Lecher), a physician who had been her husband's assistant. The family lived on a large estate at Altenberg and had a city apartment in Vienna. He was educated at the Public Schottengymnasium of the Benedictine monks in Vienna.

In his autobiographical essay, published in 1973 in Les Prix Nobel (winners of the prizes are requested to provide such essays), Lorenz credits his career to his parents, who "were supremely tolerant of my inordinate love for animals", and to his childhood encounter with Selma Lagerlöf's The Wonderful Adventures of Nils, which filled him with a great enthusiasm about wild geese.

At the request of his father, he began a premedical curriculum in 1922 at Columbia University, but returned to Vienna in 1923 to continue his studies at the University of Vienna. He graduated as Doctor of Medicine (MD) in 1928 and became an assistant professor at the Institute of Anatomy until 1935. He finished his zoological studies in 1933 and received his second doctorate (PhD).

While still a student, Lorenz began developing what would become a large menagerie, ranging from domestic to exotic animals. In his popular book King Solomon's Ring, Lorenz recounts that while studying at the University of Vienna, he kept a variety of animals at his parents' apartment, ranging from fish to a capuchin monkey named Gloria.

In 1936, at an international scientific symposium on instinct, Lorenz met his great friend and colleague Nikolaas Tinbergen. Together they studied geese – wild, domestic, and hybrid. One result of these studies was that Lorenz "realized that an overpowering increase in the drives of feeding as well as of copulation and a waning of more differentiated social instincts is characteristic of very many domestic animals". Lorenz began to suspect and fear "that analogous processes of deterioration may be at work with civilized humanity". This observation of bird hybrids caused Lorenz to believe that domestication resulting from urbanisation in humans might also cause dysgenic effects, and to argue in two papers that the Nazi eugenics policies against this were therefore scientifically justified.

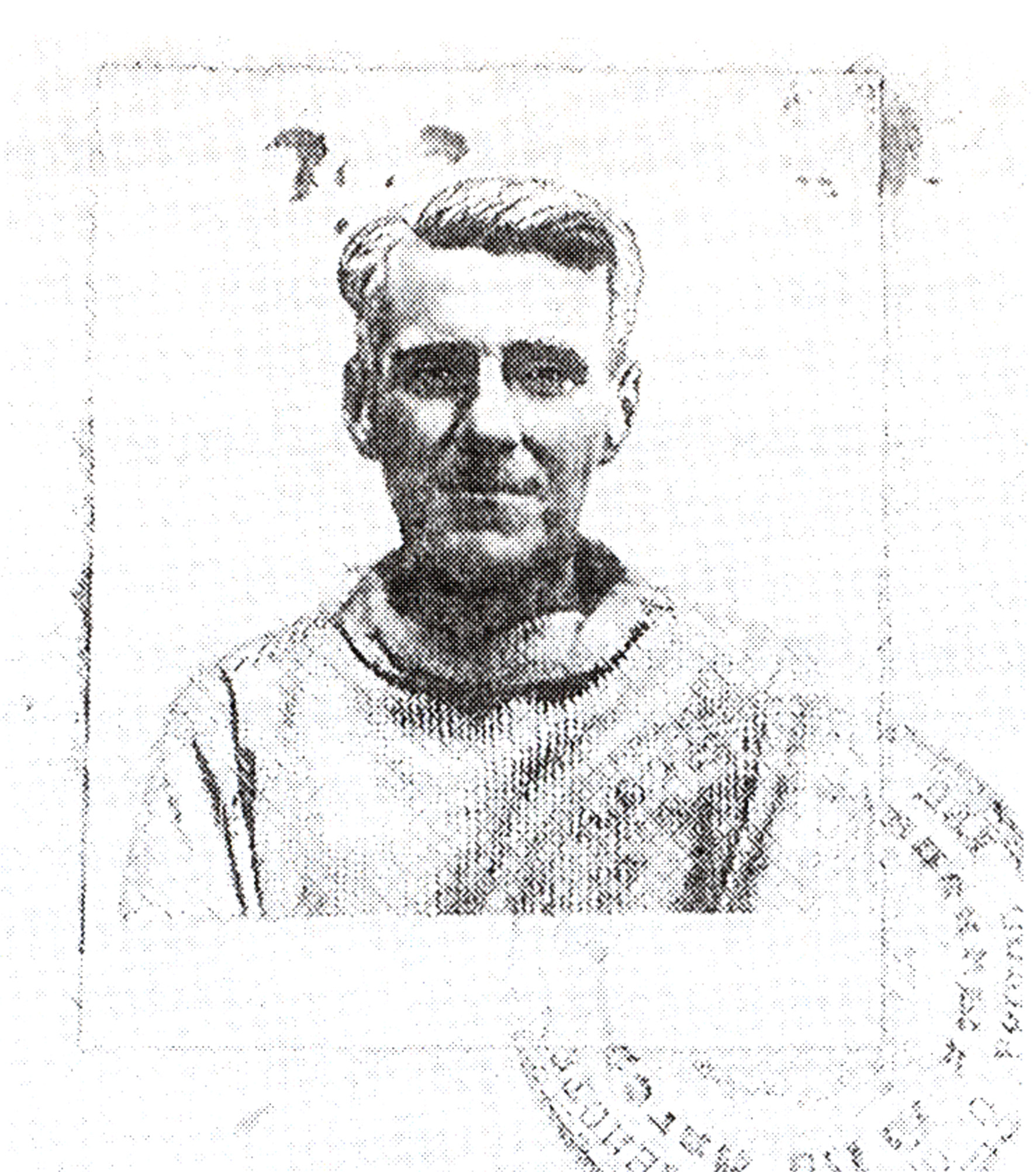
Lorenz as a Soviet POW in 1944

In 1940 he became a professor of psychology at the University of Königsberg. He was drafted into the Wehrmacht in 1941. He sought to be a motorcycle mechanic, but instead he was assigned as a military psychologist, conducting racial studies on humans in occupied Poznań under Rudolf Hippius. The objective was to study the biological characteristics of "German–Polish half-breeds" to determine whether they "benefited" from the same work ethics as "pure" Germans. The degree to which Lorenz participated in the project is unknown, but the project director Hippius referred a couple of times to Lorenz as an "examining psychologist".

Lorenz later described that he once saw transports of concentration camp inmates at Fort VII near Poznań, which made him "fully realize the complete inhumanity of the Nazis".

He was sent to the Russian front in 1944, where he quickly became a prisoner of war in the Soviet Union from 1944 to 1948. In captivity in Soviet Armenia, he continued to work as a medic and "became tolerably fluent in Russian and got quite friendly with some Russians, mostly doctors". When he was repatriated, he was allowed to keep the manuscript of a book he had been writing and his pet starling. He arrived back in Altenberg (his family home, near Vienna) both "with manuscript and bird intact". The manuscript became his 1973 book Behind the Mirror.

The Max Planck Society established the Lorenz Institute for Behavioral Physiology in Buldern, Germany, in 1950. In his memoirs, Lorenz described the chronology of his war years differently from what historians have been able to document after his death. He himself claimed that he was captured in 1942, where in reality he was only sent to the front and captured in 1944, leaving out entirely his involvement with the Poznań project.

In 1958, Lorenz transferred to the Max Planck Institute for Behavioral Physiology in Seewiesen. He shared the 1973 Nobel Prize in Physiology or Medicine "for discoveries in individual and social behavior patterns" with two other important early ethologists – Nikolaas Tinbergen and Karl von Frisch. In 1969, he became the first recipient of the Prix mondial Cino Del Duca. He was a friend and student of renowned biologist Sir Julian Huxley (grandson of "Darwin's bulldog", Thomas Henry Huxley). Famed psychoanalyst Ralph Greenson and Sir Peter Scott were good friends. Lorenz and Karl Popper were childhood friends; many years after they met, during the celebration of Popper's 80 years, they wrote together a book entitled Die Zukunft ist offen.

He retired from the Max Planck Institute in 1973 but continued to research and publish from Altenberg and Grünau im Almtal in Austria. He died on 27 February 1989 in Altenberg.

== Personal life ==
Lorenz wed his childhood companion Margarethe Gebhardt, a gynaecologist and the daughter of a local market gardener. The couple had three children – one son and two daughters. He resided on the Lorenz family estate, notable for its "fantastical neo-baroque mansion", formally belonging to his father.

== Ethology ==
Lorenz is recognized as one of the founding fathers of the field of ethology, the study of animal behavior. He is best known for his research of the principle of attachment, or imprinting, through which in some species a bond is formed between a newborn animal and its caregiver. This principle had been discovered by Douglas Spalding in the 19th century, and Lorenz's mentor Oskar Heinroth had also worked on the topic, but Lorenz's description of Prägung, imprinting, in nidifugous birds such as greylag geese in his 1935 book Der Kumpan in der Umwelt des Vogels ("The Companion in the Environment of Birds") became the foundational description of the phenomenon.

Here, Lorenz used Jakob von Uexküll's concept of Umwelt to understand how the limited perception of animals filtered out certain phenomena with which they interacted instinctively. For example, a young goose instinctively bonds with the first moving stimulus it perceives, whether it be its mother, or a person. Lorenz showed that this behavior of imprinting is what allows the goose to learn to recognize members of its own species, enabling them to be the object of subsequent behavior patterns such as mating. He developed a theory of instinctive behavior that saw behavior patterns as largely innate but triggered through environmental stimuli, for example, the hawk/goose effect. He argued that animals have an inner drive to carry out instinctive behaviors, and that if they do not encounter the right stimulus, they will eventually engage in the behavior with an inappropriate stimulus.

Lorenz's approach to ethology derived from a skepticism towards the studies of animal behavior done in laboratory settings. He considered that in order to understand the mechanisms of animal behavior, it was necessary to observe their full range of behaviors in their natural context. Lorenz did not carry out much traditional fieldwork but observed animals near his home. His method involved empathizing with animals, often using anthropomorphization to imagine their mental states. He believed that animals were capable of experiencing many of the same emotions as humans.

Tinbergen, Lorenz's friend with whom he conjointly received the Nobel Prize, summarized Lorenz's major contribution to ethology as making behavior a topic of biological inquiry, considering behavior a part of an animal's evolutionary equipment. Tinbergen and Lorenz contributed to making ethology a recognized sub-discipline within biology and founded the first specialized journal of the field "Ethology" (originally Zeitschift für Tierpsychologie).

== Involvement with Nazism ==
=== Nazism ===
Lorenz joined the Nazi Party in 1938 and accepted a university chair under the Nazi regime. In his application for party membership he wrote: "I'm able to say that my whole scientific work is devoted to the ideas of the National Socialists." His publications during that time led in later years to allegations that his scientific work had been contaminated by Nazi sympathies. His published writing during the Nazi period included support for Nazi ideas of "racial hygiene" couched in pseudoscientific metaphors.

In his autobiography, Lorenz wrote:

The same individual geese on which we conducted these experiments, first aroused my interest in the process of domestication. They were F1 hybrids of wild Greylags and domestic geese and they showed surprising deviations from the normal social and sexual behaviour of the wild birds. I realised that an overpowering increase in the drives of feeding as well as of copulation and a waning of more differentiated social instincts is characteristic of very many domestic animals. I was frightened – as I still am – by the thought that analogous genetical processes of deterioration may be at work with civilized humanity. Moved by this fear, I did a very ill-advised thing soon after the Germans had invaded Austria: I wrote about the dangers of domestication and, in order to be understood, I couched my writing in the worst of Nazi-terminology. I do not want to extenuate this action. I did, indeed, believe that some good might come of the new rulers. The precedent narrow-minded Catholic regime in Austria induced better and more intelligent men than I was to cherish this naive hope. Practically all my friends and teachers did so, including my own father who certainly was a kindly and humane man. None of us as much as suspected that the word "selection", when used by these rulers, meant murder. I regret those writings not so much for the undeniable discredit they reflect on my person as for their effect of hampering the future recognition of the dangers of domestication.

After the war, Lorenz denied having been a party member, until his membership application was made public, and he denied having known the extent of the genocide, despite his position as a psychologist in the Office of Racial Policy. He was shown to have made anti-Semitic jokes on "Jewish characteristics" in letters to his mentor Heinroth. In 2015, the University of Salzburg posthumously rescinded an honorary doctorate awarded to Lorenz in 1983, citing his party membership and his assertions in his application that he was "always a National Socialist", and that his work "stands to serve National Socialist thought". The university also accused him of using his work to spread "basic elements of the racist ideology of National Socialism".

=== Ecology ===
During the final years of his life, Lorenz supported the fledgling Austrian Green Party and in 1984 became the figurehead of the Konrad Lorenz Volksbegehren, a grass-roots movement that was formed to prevent the building of a power plant at the Danube near Hainburg an der Donau and thus the destruction of the surrounding woodland.

== Contributions and legacy ==
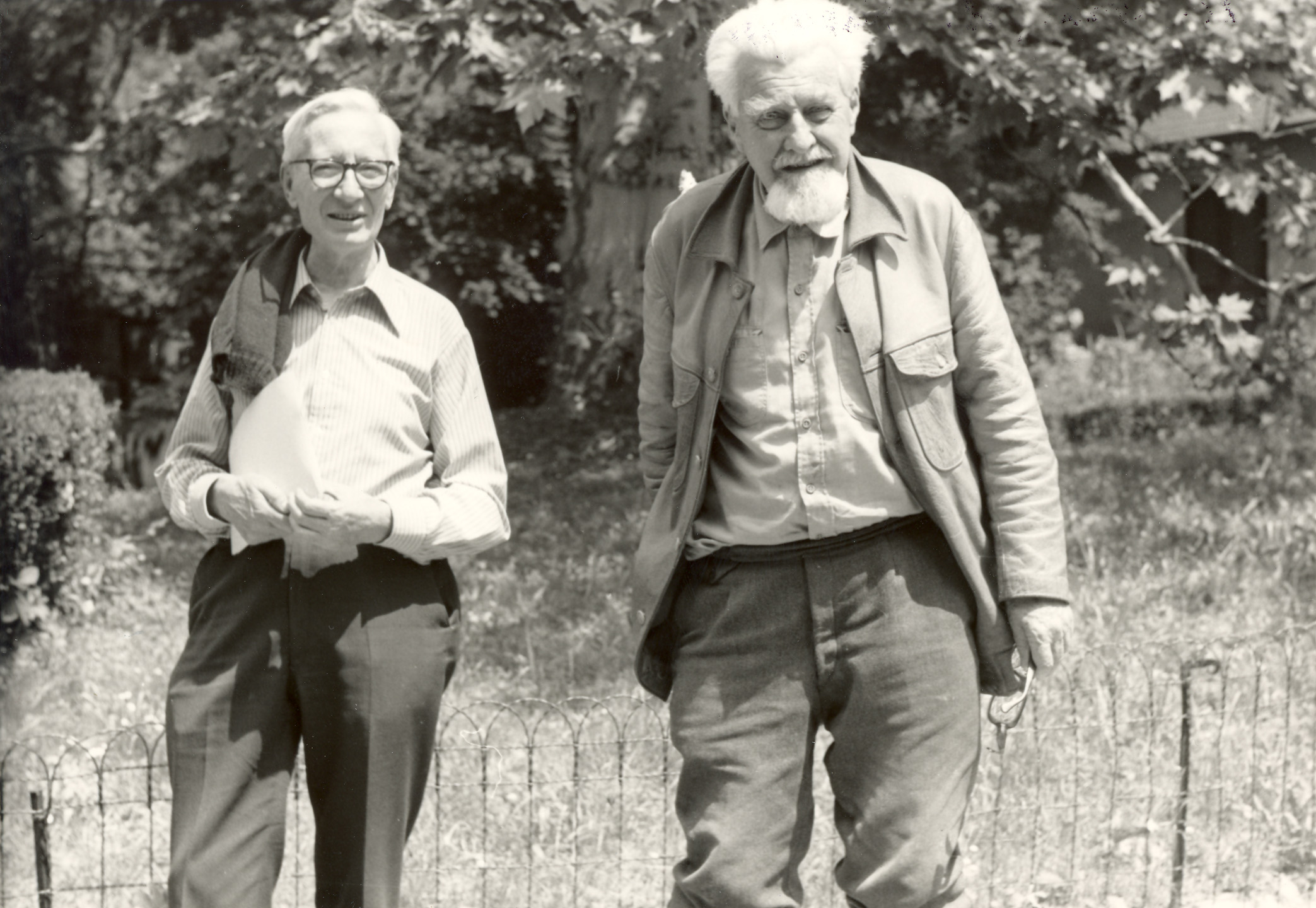
With Nikolaas Tinbergen (left), 1978

Lorenz has been called "The father of ethology" by Niko Tinbergen. Perhaps Lorenz's most important contribution to ethology was his idea that behavior patterns can be studied as anatomical organs. This concept forms the foundation of ethological research. However, Richard Dawkins called Lorenz a "'good of the species' man", stating that the idea of group selection was "so deeply ingrained" in Lorenz's thinking that he "evidently did not realize that his statements contravened orthodox Darwinian theory".

Together with Nikolaas Tinbergen, Lorenz developed the idea of an innate releasing mechanism to explain instinctive behaviors (fixed action patterns). They experimented with "supernormal stimuli" such as giant eggs or dummy bird beaks, which they found could release the fixed action patterns more powerfully than the natural objects for which the behaviors were adapted. Influenced by the ideas of William McDougall, Lorenz developed this into a "psychohydraulic" model of the motivation of behavior, which tended towards group selectionist ideas, which were influential in the 1960s. Another of his contributions to ethology is his work on imprinting. His influence on a younger generation of ethologists and his popular works were important in bringing ethology to the attention of the general public.

Lorenz claimed that there was widespread contempt for the descriptive sciences. He attributed this to the denial of perception as the source of all scientific knowledge: "a denial that has been elevated to the status of religion". He wrote that in comparative behavioral research, "it is necessary to describe various patterns of movement, record them, and above all, render them unmistakably recognizable".

There are three research institutions named after Lorenz in Austria: the Konrad Lorenz Institute for Evolution and Cognition Research (KLI) was housed in Lorenz' family mansion at Altenberg before moving to Klosterneuburg in 2013; the Konrad Lorenz Forschungsstelle (KLF) at his former field station in Grünau; and the Konrad Lorenz Institute of Ethology, an external research facility of the University of Veterinary Medicine Vienna.

=== Vision of the challenges facing humanity ===
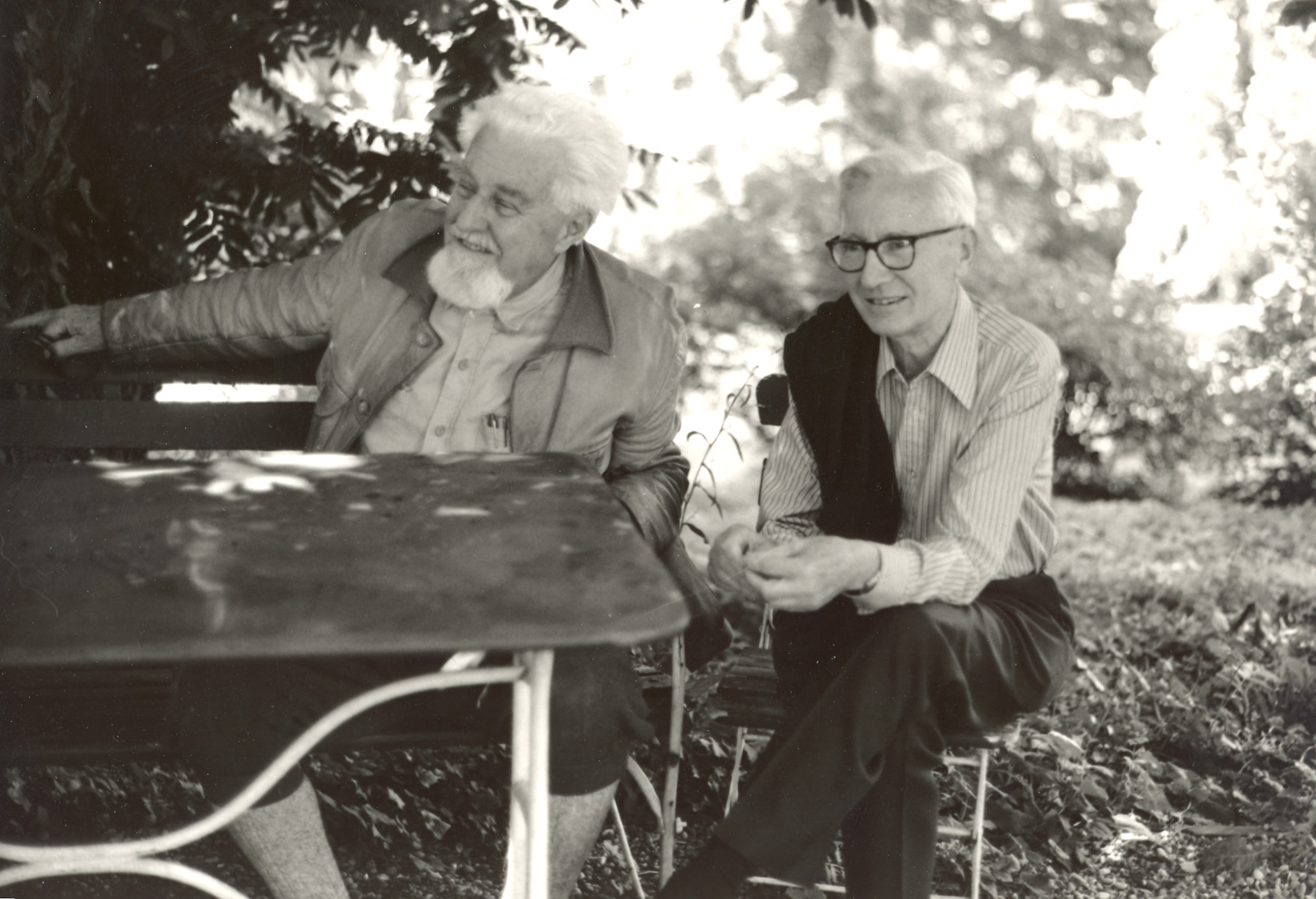
With Nikolaas Tinbergen (right), 1978

Lorenz predicted the relationship between market economics and the threat of ecological catastrophe. In his 1973 book Civilized Man's Eight Deadly Sins, Lorenz addresses the following paradox:

All the advantages that man has gained from his ever-deepening understanding of the natural world that surrounds him, his technological, chemical and medical progress, all of which should seem to alleviate human suffering ... tends instead to favor humanity's destruction.

Lorenz adopts an ecological model to attempt to grasp the mechanisms behind this contradiction. Thus "all species ... are adapted to their environment ... including not only inorganic components ... but all the other living beings that inhabit the locality".

Fundamental to Lorenz's theory of ecology is the function of negative feedback mechanisms, which, in hierarchical fashion, dampen impulses that occur beneath a certain threshold. The thresholds themselves are the product of the interaction of contrasting mechanisms. Thus pain and pleasure act as checks on each other:

To gain a desired prey, a dog or wolf will do things that, in other contexts, they would shy away from: run through thorn bushes, jump into cold water and expose themselves to risks which would normally frighten them. All these inhibitory mechanisms ... act as a counterweight to the effects of learning mechanisms ... The organism cannot allow itself to pay a price which is not worth paying.

In nature, these mechanisms tend towards a "stable state" among the living beings of an ecology:

A closer examination shows that these beings ... not only do not damage each other, but often constitute a community of interests. It is obvious that the predator is strongly interested in the survival of that species, animal or vegetable, which constitutes its prey. ... It is not uncommon that the prey species derives specific benefits from its interaction with the predator species ...

Lorenz states that humanity is the one species not bound by these mechanisms, being the only one that has defined its own environment:

[The pace of human ecology] is determined by the progress of man's technology ... human ecology (economy) is governed by mechanisms of positive feedback, defined as a mechanism which tends to encourage behavior rather than to attenuate it. Positive feedback always involves the danger of an "avalanche" effect ... One particular kind of positive feedback occurs when individuals of the same species enter into competition among themselves ... For many animal species, environmental factors keep ... intraspecies selection from [leading to] disaster ... But there is no force which exercises this type of healthy regulatory effect on humanity's cultural development; unfortunately for itself, humanity has learned to overcome all those environmental forces which are external to itself.

Regarding aggression in human beings, Lorenz states:

Let us imagine that an absolutely unbiased investigator on another planet, perhaps on Mars, is examining human behavior on Earth, with the aid of a telescope whose magnification is too small to enable him to discern individuals and follow their separate behavior, but large enough for him to observe occurrences such as migrations of peoples, wars, and similar great historical events. He would never gain the impression that human behavior was dictated by intelligence, still less by responsible morality. If we suppose our extraneous observer to be a being of pure reason, devoid of instincts himself and unaware of the way in which all instincts in general and aggression in particular can miscarry, he would be at a complete loss how to explain history at all. The ever-recurrent phenomena of history do not have reasonable causes. It is a mere commonplace to say that they are caused by what common parlance so aptly terms "human nature". Unreasoning and unreasonable human nature causes two nations to compete, though no economic necessity compels them to do so; it induces two political parties or religions with amazingly similar programs of salvation to fight each other bitterly, and it impels an Alexander or a Napoleon to sacrifice millions of lives in his attempt to unite the world under his scepter. We have been taught to regard some of the persons who have committed these and similar absurdities with respect, even as "great" men, we are wont to yield to the political wisdom of those in charge, and we are all so accustomed to these phenomena that most of us fail to realize how abjectly stupid and undesirable the historical mass behavior of humanity actually is.

Lorenz does not see human independence from natural ecological processes as necessarily bad. He states that:

A completely new [ecology] which corresponds in every way to [humanity's] desires ... could, theoretically, prove as durable as that which would have existed without his intervention.

However, the principle of competition, typical of Western societies, destroys any chance of this:

The competition between human beings destroys with cold and diabolic brutality ... Under the pressure of this competitive fury we have not only forgotten what is useful to humanity as a whole, but even that which is good and advantageous to the individual. [...] One asks, which is more damaging to modern humanity: the thirst for money or consuming haste ... in either case, fear plays a very important role: the fear of being overtaken by one's competitors, the fear of becoming poor, the fear of making wrong decisions or the fear of not being up to snuff ...

=== Philosophical speculations ===
In his 1973 book Behind the Mirror: A Search for a Natural History of Human Knowledge, Lorenz considers the old philosophical question of whether our senses correctly inform us about the world as it is, or provide us only with an illusion. His answer comes from evolutionary biology. Only traits that help us survive and reproduce are transmitted. If our senses gave us wrong information about our environment, we would soon be extinct. Therefore, we can be sure that our senses give us correct information, for otherwise we would not be here to be deceived.

== Honours and awards ==
- Elected a member of the American Academy of Arts and Sciences in 1957
- Austrian Decoration for Science and Art in 1964
- Elected a Foreign Member of the Royal Society (ForMemRS) in 1964
- Elected a member of the United States National Academy of Sciences in 1966
- Kalinga Prize for the Popularization of Science in 1969
- Gold Medal of the Humboldt Society in 1972Rupke, Nicolaas (2008). Alexander Von Humboldt: A Metabiography. University of Chicago Press. p. 151. ISBN 978-0-226-73149-0.
- Nobel Prize in Physiology or Medicine in 1973
- Elected a member of the American Philosophical Society in 1974
- Honorary Doctorate, University of Salzburg, 1983, revoked in 2015
- Grand Cross with Star and Sash of the Order of Merit of the Federal Republic of Germany (Großes Verdienstkreuz mit Stern und Schulterband) in 1984
- Bavarian Maximilian Order for Science and Art in 1984

== Works ==
Lorenz's best-known books are King Solomon's Ring and On Aggression, both written for a popular audience. His scientific work appeared mainly in journal articles, written in German; it became widely known to English-speaking scientists through its description in Tinbergen's 1951 book The Study of Instinct, though many of his papers were later published in English translation in the two volumes titled Studies in Animal and Human Behavior.

- King Solomon's Ring (1949) (Er redete mit dem Vieh, den Vögeln und den Fischen, 1949)
- Man Meets Dog (1950) (So kam der Mensch auf den Hund, 1950)
- Evolution and Modification of Behaviour (1965)
- On Aggression (1966) (Das sogenannte Böse. Zur Naturgeschichte der Aggression, 1963)
- Studies in Animal and Human Behavior, Volume I (1970)
- Studies in Animal and Human Behavior, Volume II (1971)
- Motivation of Human and Animal Behavior: An Ethological View. With Paul Leyhausen (1973). New York: D. Van Nostrand Co. ISBN 0-442-24886-5
- Behind the Mirror: A Search for a Natural History of Human Knowledge (1973) (Die Rückseite des Spiegels. Versuch einer Naturgeschichte menschlichen Erkennens, 1973)
- Civilized Man's Eight Deadly Sins (1974) (Die acht Todsünden der zivilisierten Menschheit, 1973)
- The Year of the Greylag Goose (1979) (Das Jahr der Graugans, 1979)
- The Foundations of Ethology (1982)
- The Waning of Humaneness (1987) (Der Abbau des Menschlichen, 1983)
- Here I Am – Where Are You? – A Lifetime's Study of the Uncannily Human Behaviour of the Greylag Goose. (1988). Translated by Robert D. Martin from Hier bin ich – wo bist du?
- The Natural Science of the Human Species: An Introduction to Comparative Behavioral Research – The Russian Manuscript (1944–1948) (1995)

== See also ==
- Animal mobbing behavior
- Imprinting (psychology)
- List of Austrian writers
