= Natalia Gippius =

Natalia Aleksandrovna Gippius (Russian: Гиппиус, Наталья Александровна), 1905–1994, was a Soviet painter and graphic artist.

== Biography ==
Natalia Aleksandrovna Gippius was born in 1905 in St. Petersburg in a family with long traditions in the arts. Her aunt was the famous poet Zinaida Gippius, and her other aunt was also a painter, and studied with Ilya Repin.

After attending a specialized art school in Perm (1924–1928), Natalia Gippius was admitted in the VKhuTeIn-Polygraphic Institute of Moscow in 1928, and studied under D. Moore, A. Deineka, N. Udaltsova, M. Rodionov and K. Istomin. At the VKhuTeIn she met her future husband, Konstantin Lekomtsev, a very talented portrait painter. After graduating in 1935, she did the typical road-show for a Soviet artist in the 1930s. She travelled around in the Soviet Union, depicting the construction of socialism in Mordovia, Kuban, Altai, and Saransk. She painted female tractor brigades, collective farms and army hospitals, often with a distinct inspiration from the 1920s Avant-garde.

In 1937 she becomes a member of the Artists' Union in Moscow.

Starting from the 1950s and through the 1970s, she focused on her beloved Moscow, and depicted the old Moscow, the Muscovites and the building of the New Moscow. She becomes then a member of the urban artists' group "Moscow through the Windows of a Bus", active in Moscow from 1965 to 1985. Her lively temperas with their almost festive perception of life act as a mirror of the times. The Moscow scenes are snapshots taken in an effort to capture a moment of the beauty of city life. Her spontaneous art reveals all that which a passer-by could miss, all that ordinary citizens are often too busy to notice. Gippius' works are genuinely original among her contemporaries, making her art all the more isolated and precious.

== Exhibitions ==
- 1931 Young Artists, Khudozhnik, Kuznetskii Most 11, Moscow
- 1938 Vsekokhudozhnik, Kuznetskii Most 11, Moscow Female Artists, Vsekokhudozhnik, Kuznetskii Most, Moscow
- 1939 MoSKh, Young Graphic Artists, Moscow
- 1940 7th Exhibition of Moscow Artists, Moscow Youth-Komsomol Exhibition, Moscow
- 1941 Exhibition of Female Architects and Painters, Moscow
- 1944 Exhibition of Artists of the Russian Federation, Moscow
- 1953 Exhibition of Moscow Female Artists, Moscow
- 1958 Exhibition at the Artists Union
- 1959 Exhibition to the 21st Congress of KPSS, Moscow
- 1960 Exhibition of Watercolours and Ceramics of Moscow Artists, Moscow
- 1961 Exhibition of Moscow Artists, Moscow Exhibition of Female Artists, Moscow
- 1964 Moscow - Our Capitol, Moscow
- 1966 For the Defenders of Moscow, 20 years after the Moscow Battle, Moscow Autumn Exhibition of Moscow Artists
- 1970 8 March. International Women's Day, Tsentralnii Dom Literatorov, Moscow (yearly show)
- 1972 Personal Exhibition, Moscow Historical Moscow, Moscow Art from R.Vugina's Collection, Moscow
- 1976 Spring Exhibition, Moscow
- 1979 Our Moscow. From the collection of R. Vugina
- 1981 A round Our Country, All-Russian Exhibition 8th Exhibition of Prints of Moscow Artists, Moscow 40 Years after the Battle at Moscow, Moscow
- 1982 50 Years of MOSKh - 1932-1982, Moscow
- 1983 The Blue Roads, Exhibition of Marine Artists, Moscow
- 1985 40 Years after Victory. Exhibition of Artists/War Veterans, Moscow
- 1985 Exhibition of Moscow Artists, Moscow
- 1987 From the Female Moscow Artists to the World Congress of Women, Moscow
- 1989 Self Portrait, Moscow
- 1990 Personal Exhibition, Moscow
- 1991 Moscow Artists of the 1920s-1930s, Moscow
- 2001 Gamborg Gallery, Moscow

== Bibliography ==
- 1990 Catalogue from Personal Exhibition, Moscow
- 1991 Moscow Artists of the 1920s-1930s, Moscow, (p. 38)
- 2000 Artist, Destiny, and the Large Turning Point, Moscow, (pp. 18–26, 80-81)
- 2000 VKhUTeMas, S.O. Khan Makhomedov, Moscow, (pp. 253, 255 illustrations)
- 2002 Artists of the USSR. Russian Academy of the Arts
