= King Solomon's Ring (book) =

1949 book by Konrad Lorenz

- First edition
- Author: Konrad Lorenz
- Original title: Er redete mit dem Vieh, den Vögeln und den Fischen
- Translator: Marjorie Kerr Wilson
- Language: German
- Publisher: Verlag Dr. G. Borotha-Schoeler
- Publication date: 1949

King Solomon's Ring (German: Er redete mit dem Vieh, den Vögeln und den Fischen, lit. 'He spoke to the cattle, the birds and the fish', referencing 1 Kings 4:33) is a general-audience zoological book, written by Austrian scientist Konrad Lorenz in 1949. The first English-language edition was published in 1952.

The English title refers to the legendary Seal of Solomon, a ring that supposedly gave King Solomon the power to speak to animals. Lorenz claimed to have achieved this feat of communication with several species, by raising them in and around his home and observing their behavior. King Solomon's Ring describes the methods of his investigation and his resulting conclusions about animal psychology.

In August 2003, it was BBC Radio 4's Book of the Week read by Nigel Anthony.
