= Rudolf Hippius =

German psychologist

Rudolf Werner Georg Hippius (9 June 1905 in Schadriza, Pskov Oblast – 23 October 1945 in Prague) was a Baltic-German psychologist and sociologist. He is best known for his work in "racial psychology" carried out under the auspices of the Nazi regime, and specifically his study of the "suitability" of people of mixed German and Slavic descent, which he carried out in the occupied Reichsuniversität Posen or University of Poznan from 1942 to 1944. The objective of the study was to determine whether individuals who were of mixed German and Slavic heritage were suitable to be considered for German citizenship or if they should be deported. It was during this period that Konrad Lorenz worked with him on the project, and which was to affect the later reputation of Lorenz. Hippius died in a Soviet prison camp in 1945.
