= Leontine Hippius =

Estonian politician

Leontine Hippius (born 23 July [O.S. 4 August] (Note: The two dates correspond to the Old Style (Julian calendar) and New Style (Gregorian calendar) systems.) 1868 in Jakobstadt, Courland Governorate; now Jēkabpils, Latvia) (Note: Jakobstadt is the German name for Jēkabpils, a town in Latvia. (Kurl) is short for Courland (German: Kurland), a historical region in western Latvia that was part of the Courland Governorate in the Russian Empire.) was an Estonian politician.

During World War I, she was a member of the Estl. Damenkomitee d. R. K., for the care of Estonian prisoners of war in Germany and Austria-Hungary, and a society for the care of Baltic-German prisoners, among others.

From 1917 to 1939, she was a member of the council of the governmental Estonian public welfare committee.

She was arrested in 1941 and subsequently disappeared, with no further record of her fate.
