= Civilized Man's Eight Deadly Sins =

1973 book by Konrad Lorenz

- Author: Konrad Lorenz
- Original title: Die acht Todsünden der zivilisierten Menschheit
- Translator: Marjorie Kerr Wilson
- Language: German
- Publisher: Piper Verlag
- Publication date: 1973
- Publication place: Germany
- English publication date: 1974
- Pages: 157

Civilized Man's Eight Deadly Sins (German: Die acht Todsünden der zivilisierten Menschheit) is a book by the Austrian zoologist Konrad Lorenz. It is about major threats against humans that Lorenz sees in ongoing disregards of nature and in new and emerging technologies. The material originated as six lectures Lorenz held for Bayerischer Rundfunk in 1970, before a revised version was published as a book in 1973.

The eight threats Lorenz warns about are:

1. Overpopulation
2. Crimes against nature
3. Obsessive technological development
4. Emotional atrophy
5. Genetic decay
6. Ruptured traditions
7. Indoctrination
8. Nuclear weaponry
