= Social Issues Research Centre =

British think tank

The Social Issues Research Centre (SIRC) is a non-profit think tank working on social and lifestyle issues. It is based in Oxford, but is not part of, and has no relationship to, Oxford University.

== Organisation and focus ==
SIRC has a ‘social intelligence’ unit, monitoring and assessing social, cultural and ideological trends. SIRC's approach has an anthropological and psychological rather than a sociological flavour.

The SIRC has played a central role in advising the government on the development of a "Code of Practice on Science and Health Communication" for communication science issues to the media, which has been criticised for promoting mainstream views and suppressing dissenting voices.

== Criticism ==
When the SIRC criticised journalists for publishing stories on health scares, the BMJ asked "how seriously should journalists take an attack from an organisation that is so closely linked to the drinks industry?." The commissioning of the SIRC by pharmaceutical industry group HRT Aware to write a well-received report highlighting favourable outcomes from HRT was also noted in an editorial in the BMJ as part of a PR campaign following the 2002 Women's Health Initiative study. The BMJ noted that SIRC shared its leading staff and offices with the research company MCM Research, which asked on its website: "Do your PR initiatives sometimes look too much like PR initiatives?"

== Staff ==
The advisory board includes the social anthropologists Professor Lionel Tiger, Professor Dwight Heath and Professor Robin Fox.

Directors include

- Kate Fox. She has published on beauty & body image, the psychology of scent, pub behaviour, body language, etiquette, gossip, drugs, flirting, celebrations and stress.
- Peter Marsh – best known for work on football hooliganism and the connections between drinking and disorder.

== Funding ==
SIRC is partly funded by income from MCM Research, "an Oxford-based company which specialises in applications of social science to real-world issues and problems". SIRC also obtains funding in its own right.
