= 2020s in social history =

This is a social history of the 2020s. Social history refers to changes affecting societies and the lived experiences of their members.

== Global issues ==
=== Social effects of the COVID-19 pandemic ===
The impact on personal gatherings was strong as medical experts advised, and local authorities often mandated stay-at-home orders to prevent gatherings of any size, not just the larger events that were initially restricted. Such gatherings could be replaced by teleconferencing, or in some cases with unconventional attempts to maintain social distancing with activities such as a balcony sing-along for a concert, or a "birthday parade" for a birthday party. Replacements for gatherings were seen as significant to mental health during the crisis. Social isolation among alcohol users also adopted a trend towards Kalsarikänni or "pantsdrunking", a Finnish antisocial drinking culture.

Low income individuals were more likely to contract the coronavirus and to die from it. In both New York City and Barcelona, low income neighborhoods were disproportionately hit by coronavirus cases. Hypotheses for why this was the case included that poorer families were more likely to live in crowded housing and work in low skill jobs, such as supermarkets and elder care, which were deemed essential during the crisis. In the United States, millions of low-income people may lack access to health care due to being uninsured or underinsured. Millions of Americans lost their health insurance after losing their jobs. Many low income workers in service jobs became unemployed.

The coronavirus pandemic was followed by concern for a potential spike in suicides, exacerbated by social isolation due to quarantine and social-distancing guidelines, fear, and unemployment and financial factors. Many countries reported an increase in domestic violence and intimate partner violence attributed to lockdowns amid the COVID-19 pandemic. Financial insecurity, stress, and uncertainty led to increased aggression at home, with abusers able to control large amounts of their victims' daily life. United Nations Secretary-General António Guterres called for a domestic violence "ceasefire".

=== Race ===
The murder of George Floyd has led to many protest and riots across the United States and internationally. The stated goal of the protest has been to end police brutality and racial inequality.

=== Gender ===
The World Economic Forum published a report on the global gender gap in January 2020 that concludes gender parity will not be reached for 99.5 years. The report benchmarks 153 countries in four dimensions: Economic Participation and Opportunity, Educational Attainment, Health and Survival, and Political Empowerment. The top-ranking country for parity is Iceland, and Albania, Ethiopia, Mali, Mexico, and Spain are the most improved. At least 35 countries have achieved gender parity in education, and 71 have closed at least 97% of the gap in health. Political empowerment remains poor—85 countries have never had a female head of state and women hold only 25% of all available positions, while eight countries have no women in government at all. Globally, only 55% of women (ages 15–64) are economically active, compared to 78% of men. 72 countries do not allow women to open bank accounts or obtain credit.

=== Sexual minorities ===
- Switzerland banned discrimination on the basis of sexuality based on a referendum, putting into effect a law previously introduced in 2018, that was subsequently blocked by the government that requested a referendum to be held on the matter first.
- In Northern Ireland, the first same-sex marriage, after legislation to allow this took effect in January 2020.
- In Costa Rica, same-sex marriage and joint adoption by same-sex couples became legal on 26 May 2020.
- In the United States, the Supreme Court ruled that job discrimination against workers for their sexual orientation or gender identity is illegal.
- The Trump Administration passed a law on 12 June 2020 removing protections against discrimination from LGBTQ people in terms of health care and health insurance in the United States.

=== Drug policy ===
Drug policies continues to evolve, in particular in relation to cannabis and psychedelics. Landmark events internationally were:

- International law: the removal of cannabis and cannabis resin from Schedule IV of the treaty on narcotics, in December 2020.
- Germany: the announcement by the government elected in 2021 of the upcoming legalization of cannabis in Germany.
- United States: the pardon of minor marijuana-related federal offences and announcement of cannabis rescheduling by U.S. president Joe Biden on 6 October 2022.

=== Technology ===
Trends in technology include greater use of artificial intelligence (AI), autonomous vehicles (AV), virtual reality, a ten-year human lifespan increase (due to better drugs, stem cell manipulation, and gene therapy), renewable and sustainable energy, and space (commercialization, weaponization, and exploration).
