= Drinking culture =

Aspect of human behavior

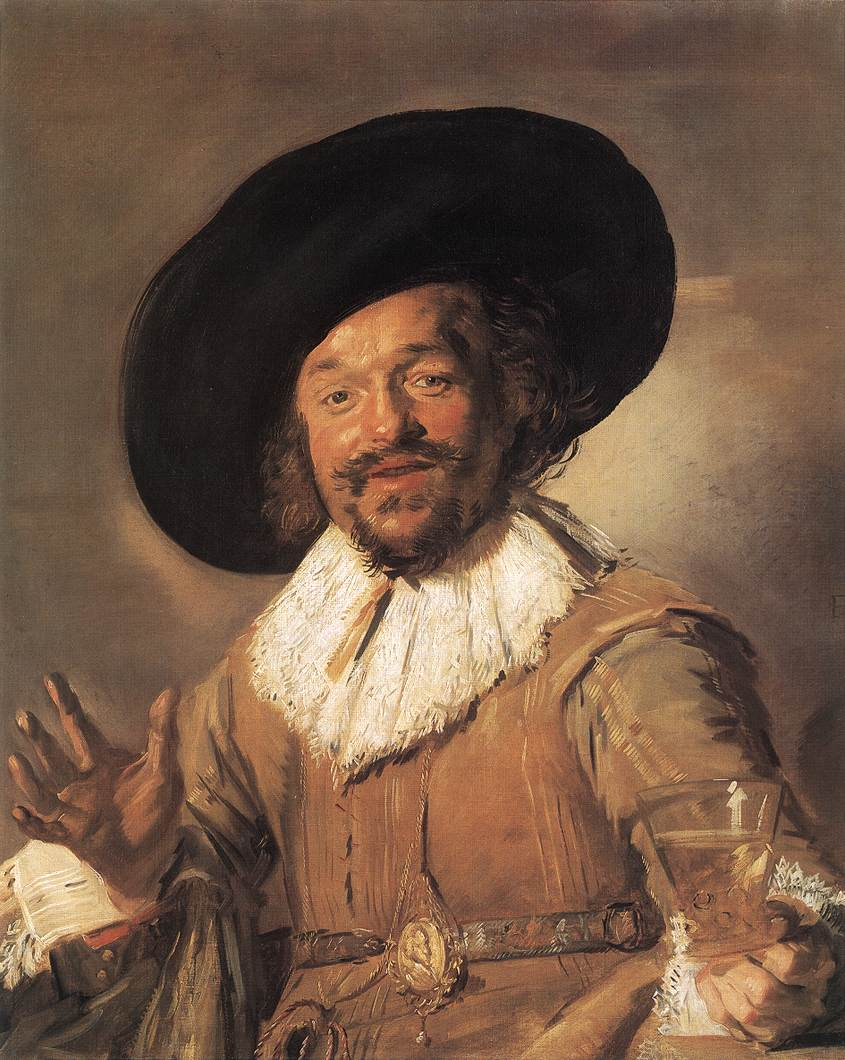
The Merry Drinker (c. 1628–1630) by Frans Hals

Drinking culture is the set of traditions, rituals, and social behaviors associated with the consumption of alcoholic beverages. Although alcoholic beverages and social attitudes toward drinking vary around the world, nearly every civilization has independently discovered the processes of brewing beer, fermenting wine, and distilling spirits, among other practices.

Alcohol has been present in numerous societies over the centuries with the production and consumption of alcoholic beverages date back to ancient civilisations. Drinking is documented in the Hebrew and Christian Bibles, in the Qur'an, in Greek and Roman literature as old as Homer, in Confucius' Analects, and in various forms of artistic expression throughout history.

Drinking habits vary significantly across the globe with many countries have developed their own regional cultures based on unique traditions around the fermentation and consumption of alcohol as a social lubricant, which may also be known as a beer culture, wine culture etc. after a particularly prominent type of drink.

== History ==
Alcohol has played a significant role in human history. The production and consumption of alcoholic beverages date back to ancient civilisations. The earliest evidence of alcohol comes from a Neolithic village dating to around 7000 BC in the Yellow Valley. Societies and cultures around the world have made use of intoxicating substances, with alcohol as the most popular, featured in temple rituals for ≈ 2,000 years. In Mesopotamia, the world's oldest known recipe for beer-making can be traced back to 3200 BC, with related pictographs dated to 4000 BC. Similarly, wine has ancient roots, with evidence of production in Jemdet Nasr in 3000 BC, Georgia from around 6000 BC, and Iran from 5000 BC. These practices were not just culinary but often held religious and medicinal significance.

Since the Greek and Roman eras, Bacchanalia rituals involved consuming heavy levels of alcohol to reach an ecstatic state of mind. Bacchanalian fraternities promote the festive consumption of wine.

Alcoholic beverages are today some of the most popular in the world. In addition to its function as a social lubricant, more prestigious forms of drinking can form integral parts of fine dining, such as in the form of a wine pairing. The expertise necessary to maintain such traditions can be provided by a sommelier or cicerone.

== Drinking styles ==
=== Binge drinking ===
Binge drinking has more than one definition, but all definitions involve drinking to excess. The National Institute on Alcohol Abuse and Alcoholism (NIAAA) defines binge drinking as a pattern of drinking alcohol that brings blood alcohol concentration (BAC) to 0.08 grams percent or above. For the typical adult, this pattern corresponds to consuming five or more drinks (men), or four or more drinks (women) in about two hours.

The concept of a "binge" has been somewhat elastic over the years, implying consumption of alcohol far beyond that which is socially acceptable. In earlier decades, "going on a binge" meant drinking over the course of several days until one was no longer able to continue drinking. This usage is known to have entered the English language as late as 1854; it derives from an English dialectal word meaning to "soak" or to "fill a boat with water". (OED, American Heritage Dictionary)

=== Social drinking ===
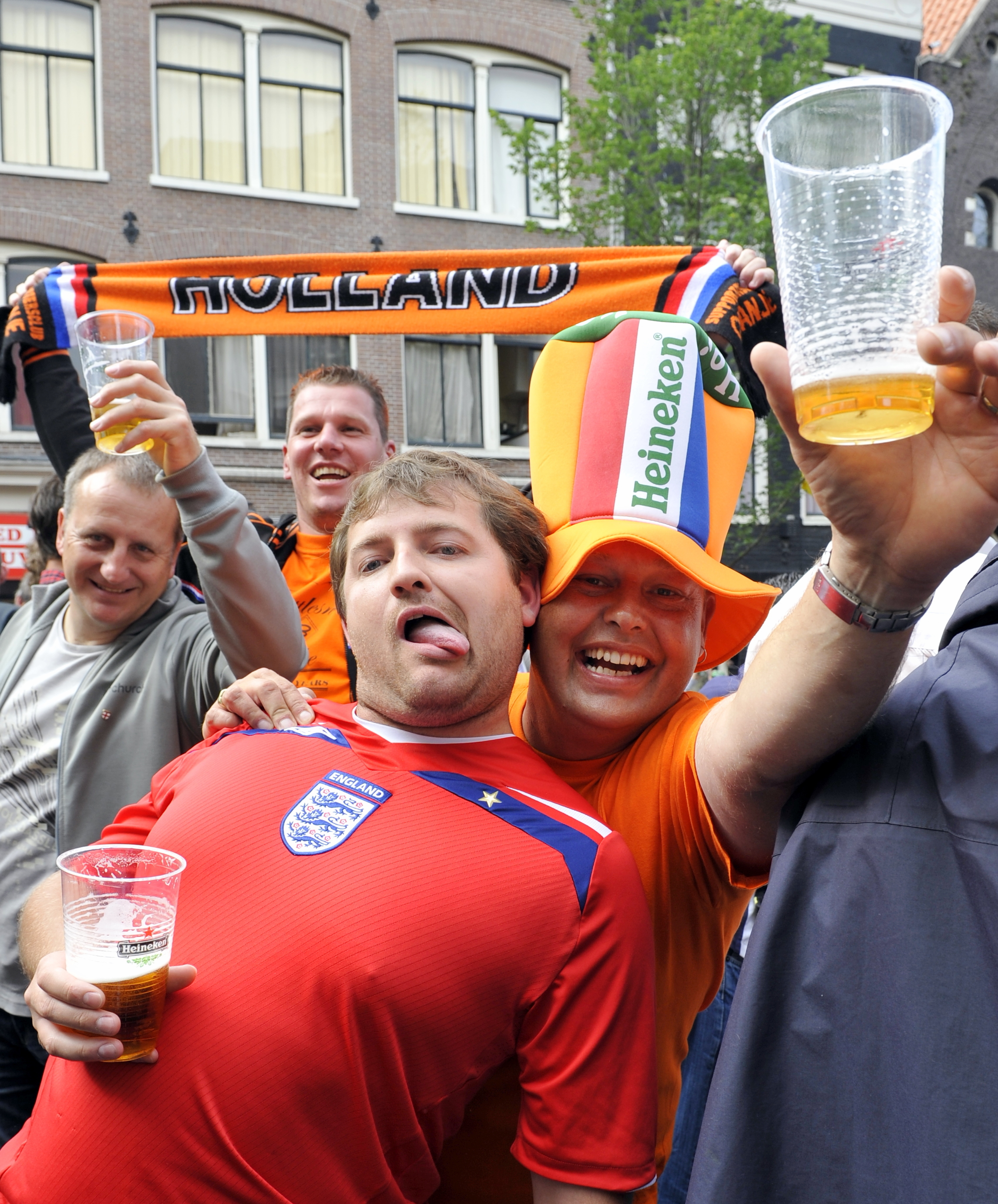
English and Dutch football fans drinking together in 2009

Social drinking refers to casual drinking of alcoholic beverages in a social setting (for example bars, nightclubs, or parties) without an intent to become intoxicated. A social drinker is also defined as a person who only drinks alcohol during social events, such as parties, and does not drink while alone (e.g., at home). In many cultures, good news is often celebrated by a group sharing alcoholic drinks. For example, sparkling wine may be used to toast the bride at a wedding, and alcoholic drinks may be served to celebrate a baby's birth. Buying someone an alcoholic drink is often considered a gesture of goodwill, an expression of gratitude, or to mark the resolution of a dispute.

Alcohol in association football and other sports has long been a complex issue, with significant cultural and behavioral implications. Football is widely observed in various settings such as television broadcasts, sports bars, and arenas, contributing to the drinking culture surrounding the sport. A 2007 study at the University of Texas at Austin monitored the drinking habits of 541 students over two American football seasons. It revealed that high-profile game days ranked among the heaviest drinking occasions, similar to New Year's Eve. Male students increased their consumption for all games, while socially active female students drank heavily during away games. Lighter drinkers also showed a higher likelihood of risky behaviors during away games as their intoxication increased. This research highlights specific drinking patterns linked to collegiate sports events.

While social drinking often involves moderation, it does not strictly emphasize safety or specific quantities, unlike terms such as responsible drinking or light, moderate, and heavy. Social settings can involve peer pressure to drink more than intended, which can be a risk factor for excessive alcohol consumption. Regularly socializing over drinks can lead to a higher tolerance for alcohol and potentially alcohol dependence, especially in groups where drinking is a central activity. According to a 2022 study, recreational heavy drinking and intoxication have become increasingly prevalent among Nigerian youth in Benin City. Traditionally, alcohol use was more accepted for men, while youth drinking was often taboo. Today, many young people engage in heavy drinking for pleasure and excitement. Peer networks encourage this behavior through rituals that promote intoxication and provide care for inebriated friends. The findings suggest a need to reconsider cultural prohibitions on youth drinking and advocate for public health interventions promoting low-risk drinking practices.

Drinking games involve consuming alcohol as part of the gameplay. They can be risky because they can encourage people to drink more than they intended to.

=== Session drinking ===
Session drinking is a chiefly British and Irish term that refers to drinking a significant quantity of beer during a "session" (i.e. a specific period of time). A session is generally a social occasion. A pub crawl (sometimes called a bar tour, bar crawl or bar-hopping) is the act of visiting multiple pubs or bars in a single session.

A "session beer", such as a session bitter, is a refreshing beer of low or, at most, moderate alcohol content, such that "you can enjoy a few of them in a drinking session and still have your wits about you."

=== Sober curious ===
Sober curious is a cultural movement and lifestyle of practicing either no or limited alcohol consumption that began to spread in the late 2010s. Being sober curious means exploring sobriety at times to challenge the systematic consumption of alcohol in different situations, mostly during social interaction. The goal is to cut back when alcohol is deemed unnecessary, avoid consuming too much alcohol, and/or improve one's health. The consumption of non-alcoholic drinks is associated with the sober curious movement. It is also called the 'No To Lo" beverages movement.

== Drinking etiquette ==
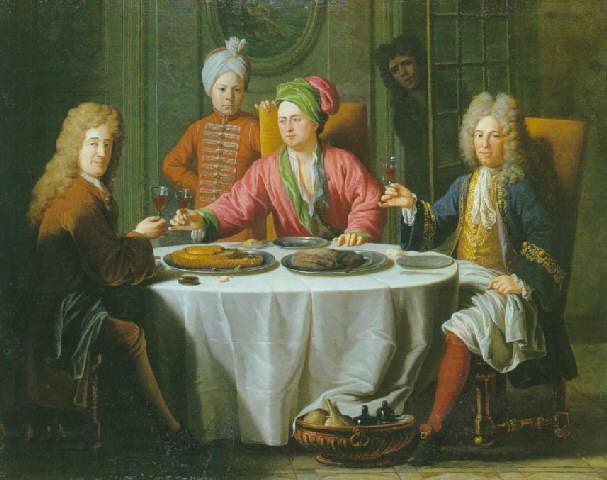
Reunion of gentlemen around a table in an interior, by Jacob van Schuppen

For the purposes of buying rounds of alcoholic drinks in English public houses, William Greaves, a retired London journalist, devised a set of etiquette guidelines as a Saturday morning essay in the defunct Today newspaper. Known as Greaves' Rules, the guidelines were based upon his long experience of pubs and rounds. The rules were later recommissioned by The Daily Telegraph and published in that newspaper on November 20, 1993. Copies of the rules soon appeared in many pubs throughout the United Kingdom.

Kate Fox, a social anthropologist, came up with a similar idea in her book Watching the English, but concluded their rationale was the need to minimize the possibility of violence between drinking companions.

When it is socially acceptable to drink differs around the world. For example, drinking early in the day is frowned upon in some countries, including Britain, Iceland, and the Czech Republic, where drinkers limit themselves to the evening; some don't start until past midnight and stay out especially late.

Though noon is often seen as the earliest appropriate time of day to consume alcohol, especially on its own, there are some exceptions, such as drinking Buck's Fizzes on Christmas Day morning. In Germany, it is tradition to get a drink on Sunday morning, Frühschoppen, to commemorate when families would go to the pub after church. In the countries of Spain, France, Russia, and Germany, day drinking is more common. Drinks served with breakfast or brunch, like a mimosa or bloody mary, are common in many cultures. However, even in countries where day drinking is socially acceptable, it is restricted compared to the heavier periods of drinking recurrent during weekend days.

=== Vertical drinking ===
Vertical drinking means that all or most of the patrons in an establishment are standing while drinking. This is linked to faster rates of consumption and can lead to tension and possibly violence as patrons attempt to maneuver around each other.

== Social and cultural significance ==
Drinking customs vary significantly across cultures. In many Western societies, raising a toast during celebrations or milestones is a common practice. In contrast, in Japanese culture, the practice of 'nomikai' – a drinking party among colleagues or friends – is prevalent, reflecting their communal approach to drinking. Similarly, in some Native American societies, alcohol consumption has historically been limited and regulated through community norms.

=== Spiritual use ===
Many religions prohibit or advise against alcohol use. However, spiritual use of alcohol is found in some religions and schools with esoteric influences, including the Sufi Bektashi Order and Alevi Jem ceremonies, in the Japanese religion Shinto, by the new religious movement Thelema, in Vajrayana Buddhism, in Vodou faith of Haiti, and in the Jewish Kiddush.

== By country ==
Drinking habits vary significantly across the globe. In many European countries, wine and beer are integral to the dining experience, reflecting a culture of moderate, meal-centric drinking. Conversely, in countries like Russia, higher rates of hard liquor consumption are observed, which has been linked to social and health issues. Furthermore, some Islamic countries have religious prohibitions against alcohol, leading to markedly different drinking practices. Some cultures may have a higher tolerance for alcohol consumption, while others may stigmatize it. Cultural practices, traditions, and expectations regarding masculinity can influence drinking patterns among people.

Some studies have noted traditional cultural differences between Northern and Southern Europe. A difference in perception may also account to some extent for historically noted cultural differences: Northern Europeans drink beer, which in the past was often of a low alcohol content (2.5% compared to today's 5%). In pre-industrial society, beer was safer to drink than water, because it had been boiled and contained alcohol. Southern Europeans drink wine and fortified wines (10–20% alcohol by volume). Traditionally, wine was watered and honeyed; drinking full strength wine was considered barbaric in Republican Rome. Nor does binge drinking necessarily equate with substantially higher national averages of per capita/per annum litres of pure alcohol consumption. There is also a physical aspect to national differences worldwide, which has not yet been thoroughly studied, whereby some ethnic groups have a greater capacity for alcohol metabolization through the liver enzymes alcohol dehydrogenase and acetaldehyde dehydrogenase.

=== Asia ===
==== Afghanistan ====
The production and consumption of alcoholic beverages, especially wine, in Afghanistan has a long tradition – going back at least to the fourth century BC. Currently, the possession and consumption of alcohol is prohibited for Afghan nationals. However, the Afghan government provided a license for various many outlets to distribute alcoholic beverages to foreign journalists and tourists, and black market alcohol consumption is prevalent as well. Bringing two bottles or two litres of alcoholic beverages was allowed for foreigners entering Afghanistan before the Taliban takeover in August 2021.

==== China ====
There is a long history of alcoholic drinks in China. They include rice and grape wine, beer, whisky and various liquors including baijiu, the most-consumed distilled spirit in the world.

==== Korea ====
Korea's interest in creating its own alcohol came about during the Koryo Dynasty (946–943), when exposure to foreign cultures and the introduction of distilled water created the basis and technique for distilling a unique alcohol.

Alcohol drinking in Korea helps create and form ties between family members and friends. Drinking is very present throughout traditional family rituals such as honoring ancestors. Aside from traditional holiday and family ritual drinking, alcohol consumption has modernized and become a major aspect of everyday socialization in Korean culture.

==== Philippines ====
The Philippines has its own unique drinking culture and practices that are based on influences from its Austronesian heritage to the colonial influences of Spain, the United States, and Japan.

=== Europe ===
Alcohol preferences in Europe vary from country to country between beer, wine or spirits. These preferences are traditionally associated with certain regions. Hence, the Central European pattern of alcohol consumption is associated with beer-drinking, the Mediterranean pattern with wine-drinking and the Eastern or Northern European pattern with spirit-drinking countries. However, traditional preferences do not necessarily correspond to current drinking habits, as beer has become the most popular alcoholic drink world-wide.

==== Finland ====
Finland has one of the most significant drinking cultures in Europe, with the second highest rate of alcohol consumption in the Nordic countries. Since the early 1960s, the total consumption of alcohol has quadrupled and negative effects of alcohol have increased. Intoxication is not seen as shameful, and is instead praised and seen as a sign of sociality.

One major aspect of modern Finnish alcohol culture is the concept of "Pantsdrunk" (kalsarikännit), referring to a drinking practice in which the drinker consumes drinks at home dressed in very little clothing, usually underwear, with no intention of going out. Alcohol is mostly consumed on the weekends in Finland.

==== Germany ====
Drinking culture is very prevalent in Germany, particularly with beer. As of 2013, Germans drink 28 gallons of beer per capita each year. Alcoholism is also an issue, with one-fifth of the population being labeled as "hazardous drinkers" in a 2022 study. Germans are able to purchase and consume soft alcoholic beverages and wine at the age of 16. At 18, Germans are legally allowed to buy and drink beer, wine, and other distilled spirits. The legal limit for blood alcohol concentration is 0.5 milligrams per milliliter of blood.

==== Russia ====
Alcohol consumption in Russia remains among the highest in the world. High volumes of alcohol consumption have serious negative effects on Russia's social fabric and bring political, economic, and public health ramifications. Alcoholism has been a problem throughout the country's history because drinking is a pervasive, socially acceptable behavior in Russian society, and alcohol has also been a major source of government revenue for centuries.

==== United Kingdom ====
Throughout its history, the United Kingdom has had the pub as a central gathering spot in the community. Into the modern day, the English pub is a common social gathering place. The United Kingdom ranks 24th in the world for per capita alcohol consumption, with the prevalence of pub culture sometimes being cited as a factor in the country's high alcohol consumption. On average, the British drink an average of 9.7 litres of alcohol per year. Statistics in 2023 have revealed that around 71.2% of adults in the United Kingdom drink at least once a week.

=== Islamic world ===
Alcoholic drinks are generally prohibited under Islamic thought, with the Quran including several verses that admonish the consumption of khamr, an Arabic term meaning intoxicants that is interpreted to include most forms of alcohol and psychoactive drugs. Due to this, Islamic countries have low rates of alcohol consumption, and it is completely banned in several of them while strictly controlled in others (such as consumption being allowed only in private places or by non-Muslims). However, a minority of Muslims do drink and believe consuming alcohol is not Qur'anically forbidden, such as the Alevi Muslims of Turkey.

Research suggests that predominantly Muslims, who live in Muslim-majority or major Muslim minority countries, believe that drinking alcohol is "morally wrong". This figure is as high as 90% in places including Indonesia, Malaysia, Pakistan and the Palestinian territories. However the view that is it morally wrong is lower in Afghanistan, Azerbaijan and Tajikistan, where 1 in 4 Muslims don't think of it as morally wrong, and in countries such as Turkey, Kazakhstan, Bosnia-Herzegovina and Tunisia, where more than 1 in 10 Muslims view drinking alcohol as "morally acceptable". Muslims in Chad and Mozambique were found in the study to have the most lenient attitude towards drinking alcohol, with 23% and 20% respectively considering it morally acceptable (albeit both still have majorities considering alcohol consumption to be morally wrong).

Muslim-majority countries produce a variety of regional distilled beverages such as arrack and rakı. There is a long tradition of viticulture in the Middle East, particularly in Egypt (where it is legal) and in Iran (where it is banned).

==== Somalia ====
Alcohol in Somalia is prohibited by the country's Muslim culture, but historically was allowed in the country and continues to exist illicitly. During the period of Italian Somalia, rum was produced from local sugarcane, continuing until the fall of the Siad Barre Government in 1991, though others have reported rum consumption amongst Somali Bantu Christians.

==== Sudan ====
Alcohol in Sudan has been broadly illegal since 1983, when the single-party Sudan Socialist Union passed the Liquor Prohibition Bill, making illegal the manufacture, sale, and consumption of any form of alcohol for the Muslim citizens of the country. Alcoholic drinks have been banned since former President Jaafar Nimeiri introduced Islamic law, throwing bottles of whisky into the Nile in the capital Khartoum. On 12 July 2020, Sudan decided to allow non-Muslims to drink alcohol.

=== United States ===
The United States is ranked 39th in the world for alcohol consumption in 2024. It is ranked 1st in alcohol misuse among females, with 10.4%. The U.S., in the past, prohibited alcohol from being produced in the country. This notion is still prevalent in the country with the legal drinking age being 21, and a self reported abstinence rate of 38%. Culture varies significantly by state, with northern states drinking more than southern states.

=== Oceania ===
==== New Zealand ====
Alcohol has been consumed in New Zealand since the arrival of Europeans. The most popular alcoholic beverage is beer. The legal age to purchase alcohol is 18. New Zealand has an above-average consumption rate of alcohol, in 2016 ranking 32nd globally in per-capita total alcohol consumption.

==== Australia ====
Alcohol is commonly consumed and available at pubs and liquor stores in Australia – all of which are private enterprises. Spirits can be purchased at liquor stores and pubs, whereas most grocery stores do not sell them, although they may have separate liquor stores on their premises. Alcohol consumption is higher, according to WHO studies, than in most European countries and several Central Asian and African countries, although consumption is just as high in Australia as in North America. After tobacco, alcohol is the second leading preventable cause of death and hospitalisation in Australia.

== Health ==
Alcohol is linked to numerous health risks including liver disease, cardiovascular problems, and addiction. The World Health Organization categorizes alcohol as a Group 1 carcinogen, indicating its causal link to cancer. It is crucial to balance these perspectives to understand the full impact of alcohol on health.

Several studies over recent decades have linked moderate alcohol consumption with a reduced risk of heart disease. However, experts caution that this research may not fully account for the influence of other healthy lifestyle factors or the health history of participants who abstain from drinking.

Policy makers have often expressed concern over "drinking culture" due to the negative health effects of excess alcohol consumption. Policy makers often focus especially on patterns of problem drinking. These patterns are often expressed in geographical terms, such as in national drinking habits. Understanding drinking in young people should be done through a "developmental" framework. This would be referred to as a "whole system" approach to underage drinking, as it takes into account a particular adolescent's unique risk and protective factors—from genetics and personality characteristics to social and environmental factors.

As early as the eighth century, Saint Boniface was writing to Cuthbert, Archbishop of Canterbury, to report how "In your diocese, the vice of drunkenness is too frequent. This is an evil peculiar to pagans and to our race. Neither the Franks nor the Gauls nor the Lombards nor the Romans nor the Greeks commit it". It is probable, however, that "the vice of drunkenness" was present in all European nations. The 16th-century Frenchman Rabelais wrote comedic and absurd satires illustrating his countrymen's drinking habits, and Saint Augustin used the example of a drunkard in Rome to illustrate certain spiritual principles.

These varying capacities do not, however, avoid all health risks inherent in heavy alcohol consumption. Alcohol abuse is associated with a variety of negative health and safety outcomes. This is true no matter the individual's or the ethnic group's perceived ability to "handle alcohol". Persons who believe themselves immune to the effects of alcohol may often be the most at risk for health concerns and the most dangerous of all when operating a vehicle.

Chronic heavy drinkers display functional tolerance when they show few obvious signs of intoxication, even at high blood alcohol concentrations, which in others would be incapacitating or even fatal. Because the drinker does not experience significant behavioral impairment as a result of drinking, tolerance may facilitate the consumption of increasing amounts of alcohol. This can result in physical dependence and alcohol-related organ damage.

Pregame heavy episodic drinking (4+/5+ drinks for women/men) or more drinks is linked to a higher likelihood of engaging in high-intensity drinking (8+/10+ drinks), according to a 2022 study. The study also found that students who pregame at this level report more negative consequences compared to days with moderate pregame drinking and days without any pregame drinking.

Hazing has a long-standing presence in college fraternities, often involving alcohol as a form of punishment. This can lead to dangerous levels of intoxication and severe ethanol poisoning, sometimes resulting in fatalities. High serum ethanol levels are common among affected students.

== See also ==
- Alcohol use among college students
- Bartending
- Beer festival
- Dive bar
- Drug culture
- Flair bartending
- Happy hour
- List of public house topics
- Pregaming
- Sconcing
- Six o'clock swill
- Snaps
- Wine, women and song (phrase)

== Bibliography ==
- Hamill, Pete (1994). A Drinking Life: A Memoir. New York: Little, Brown and Company. ISBN 978-0-316-34102-8.
- Maloney, Ralph (2012). How to Drink Like a Mad Man. Mineola, New York: Dover Publications. ISBN 978-0-486-48352-8. A humorous account of the drinking culture of Madison Avenue advertising executives during the 1960s. Originally published in 1962 as The 24-Hour Drink Book: A Guide to Executive Survival.
- Moehringer, J.R. (2005). The Tender Bar: A Memoir. New York: Hyperion. ISBN 1-4013-0064-2.
