= Finnish alcohol culture =

Drinking culture in Finland

Finnish alcohol culture (Finnish: suomalainen alkoholikulttuuri) refers to the drinking culture regarding beverages containing ethyl alcohol in Finland and to the manners and habits connected to the drinking culture.

In 2023, the total consumption of alcoholic beverages in Finland was 8.7 litres of 100% alcohol per capita, which was 2.4 percent less than in 2022. Consumption of alcohol has decreased since 2007. The consumption of alcohol in Finland is the highest in the Nordic countries. Since the early 1960s, the total consumption of alcohol has quadrupled and negative effects of alcohol have increased.

In Finnish culture, the state of alcohol intoxication has not been seen as shameful. On the contrary, it is praised and seen as a sign of sociality. As consumption of alcohol has become more mundane, it has not led to a decrease in alcohol consumption or drinking to intoxication, but has instead had the opposite effect. However, the Finnish intoxication-seeking drinking culture is not an exception in the world. Not counting European wine cultures, alcohol is usually used in the world as an intoxicant, not as nourishment.

== History ==
Alcoholic beverages have been produced and consumed in Finland at least since the Iron Age (500 BCE). However, consumption of alcohol in its current scale is a new phenomenon - for example, beer (Finnish: olut) consumption in the 15th century was tens of times as much as in modern times, but the beer was considerably milder than that of today. Nowadays the consumption of alcohol in Finland is over four times as much as it was in the middle of the 20th century. The negative effects of alcohol in Finland are also historically large.

In the early 20th century, alcohol consumption in Finland was exceptionally small compared to other European countries. However, because of political reasons, many parties started to paint an image of alcohol consumption as a widespread problem in Finland and started seeking restrictions to the consumption of alcohol.

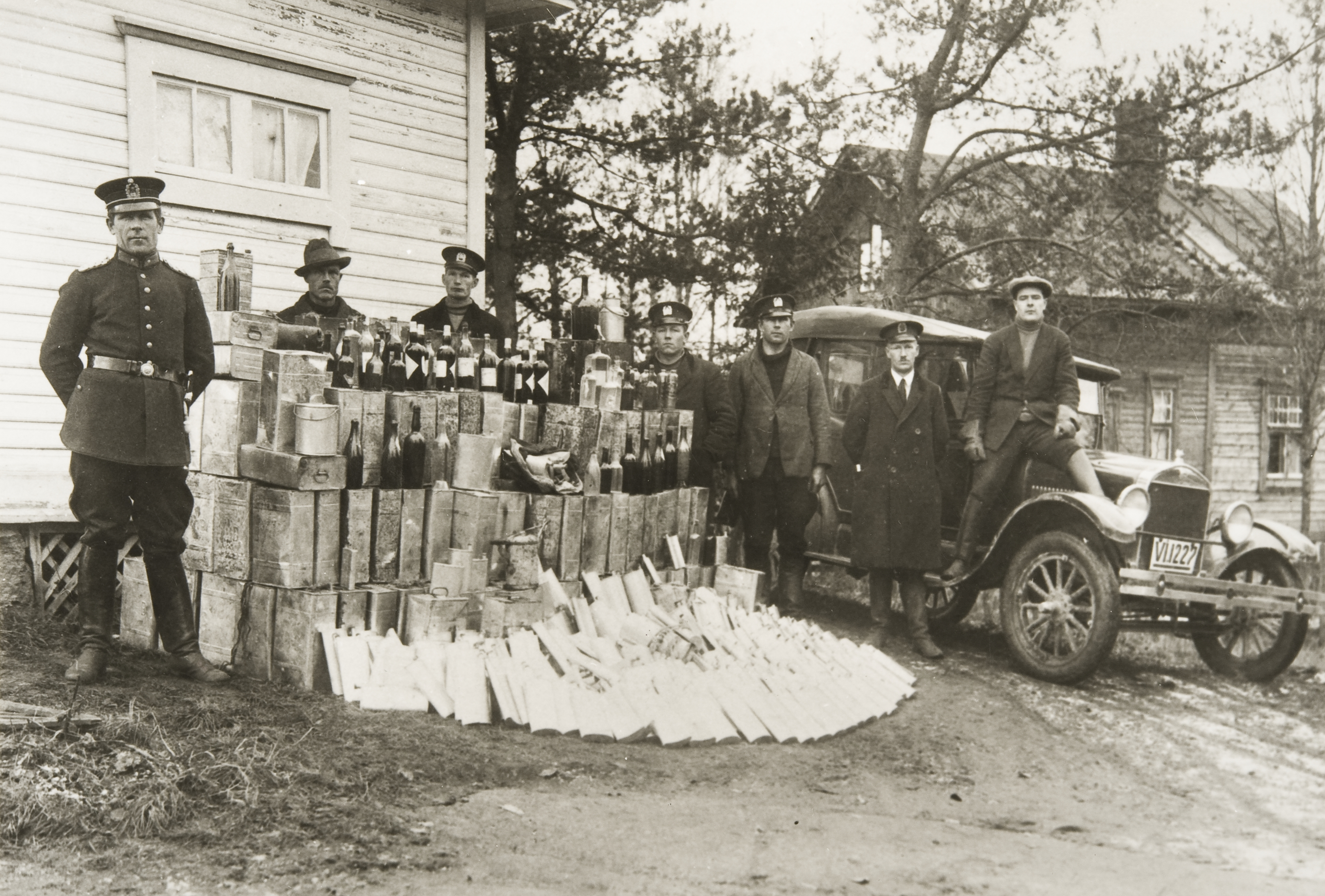
Alcohol smugglers' contraband seized during the enforcement of the prohibition law (1919–1932)

The Finnish drinking culture was partly influenced by the Temperance movement (raittiusliike) and the prohibition (kieltolaki) from 1919 to 1932. On the other hand, smuggling and illegal sales of alcohol also increased. It has even been claimed that consumption of strong alcohol increased during prohibition. After prohibition ended, sales of alcohol were handled by the state-owned monopoly Alko, and so-called "alcohol cards" (viinakortti) were used from 1944 to 1956, restricting the sale of alcohol. The "alcohol cards" were finally discontinued at the end of the year 1970.

Traditional Finnish unfiltered beer is called sahti. Sahti is primarily made from barley malts. Sahti was registered as a traditional speciality in the European Union in 2002. Beer expert Michael Jackson said that sahti was "a missing link in the history of beer brewing between Mesopotamia and current times", like "a glass full of anthropology".

Recordings of Finnish folklore include bear songs (Kalevala, poem 46, verses 547–606) and remembering of the dead. The bear songs tell of the peijaiset celebration held in honour of the killed bear, the "wedding of the bear", at the end of which the skull of the bear was taken in a "wedding convoy" back to the forest. There it was filled with festive beer and held on a sacrificial tree to preserve luck in hunting. Ancient traditions related to funerals have been recorded in Tver Karelia up to 1958. A reminiscent feast was held on the grave, where the deceased was also thought to participate. If the deceased had liked alcohol, it was also served on the grave.

== Current alcohol consumption ==
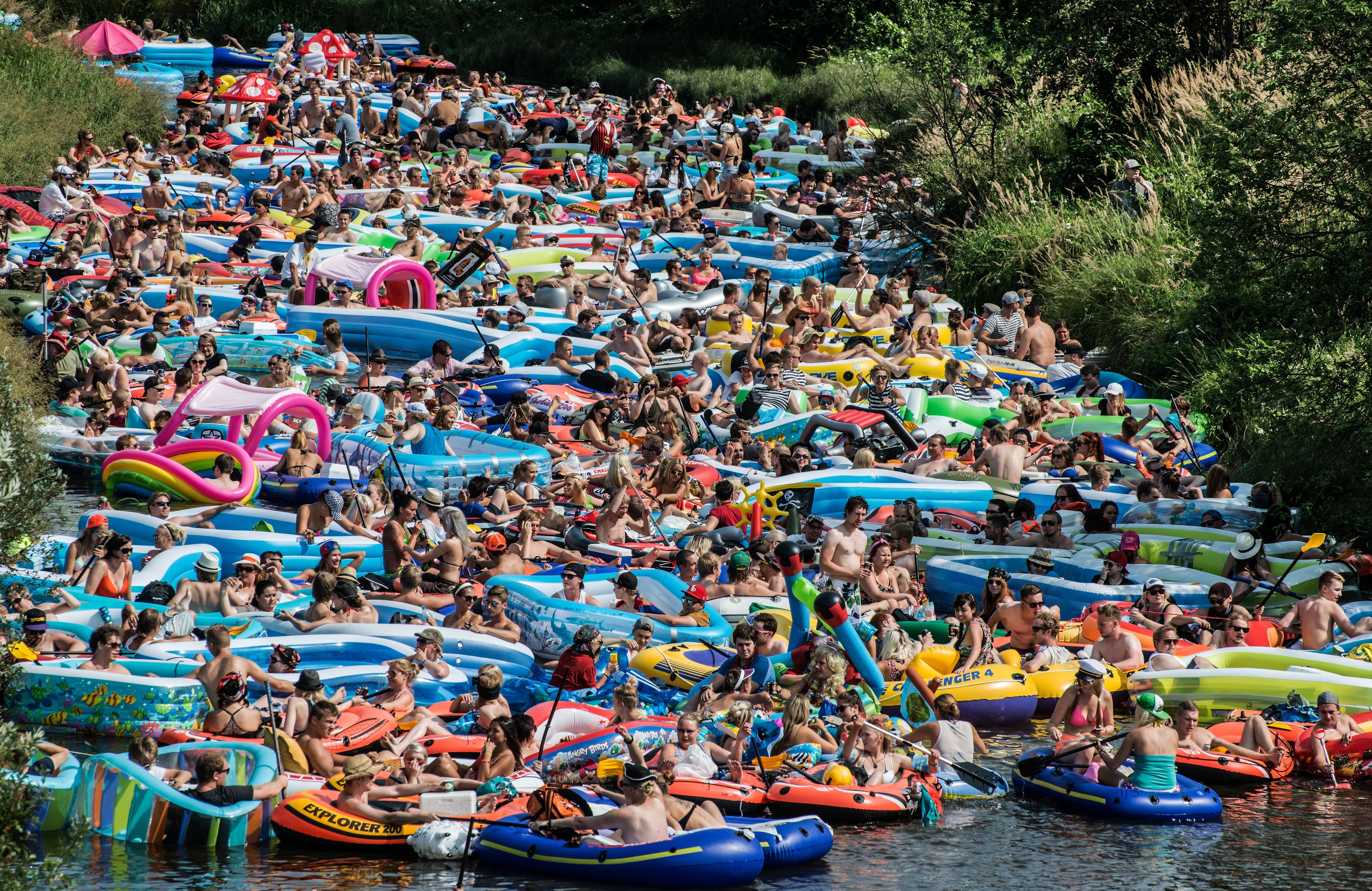
Beer floating in Vantaa in 2014

Consumption of alcohol among women has increased in Finland. In the 1960s, almost half of women from 30 to 49 years old said they did not drink alcohol, but in 2000 this had decreased to only four percent. Increased consumption has made the image of alcohol consumption more mundane and obscured the dangers related to it. There have been suggestions to reformat the classic Finnish slogan "Jos ajat, et ota" ("If you're driving, you don't drink") invented to combat drunk driving into "Jos odotat, et ota" ("If you're expecting, you don't drink") and to add it to labels of alcoholic beverages to warn against alcohol use during pregnancy.

Increased consumption of alcohol has also decreased the number of alcohol-free areas. Torsten Winter asserts that this leads to pressure to start drinking alcohol among the youth. However, not drinking alcohol has become more common among the youth. Unlike the viewpoint of the "wet generation" (märkä sukupolvi) in the 1960s, consumption of alcohol can be connected with annoying pretense instead of freedom. Possibilities for hobbies have improved among the youth and peer pressure for intoxication has decreased. Knowledge of consumption and food has improved, and the unhealthy effects of alcohol - fattening, effects on the brain and so on - are more widely known. The so-called straight edge movement has spread to some parts of Finland, which was born in the punk subculture to combat the self-destroying way of life and indifference in the world.

The significant increase in alcohol consumption has also been said to have resulted from the exceptionally low state of consumption in the 20th century. Although consumption of alcohol quadrupled from the 1960s to the 2010s, it was still only a little above the European average in the 2010s.

== See also ==
- Beer in Finland
- Drinking in public § Finland
- Health in Finland § Alcohol consumption
- Pantsdrunk

== Literature ==
- Apo, Satu: Viinan voima: Näkökulmia suomalaisten kansanomaiseen alkoholiajatteluun ja -kulttuuriin. Helsinki: Finnish literature society, 2001. ISBN 951-746-067-8.
- Kuusi, Hanna: Viinistä vapautta: Alkoholi, hallinta ja identiteetti 1960-luvun Suomessa. Helsinki: Finnish literature society, 2001. 2003. ISBN 951-746-551-3.
- Kuusisto, Alina (ed.): Wiinan viemää: Artikkeleita alkoholin ja sen lieveilmiöiden historiasta. Joensuu: Historical association of Northern Karelia, 2007. ISBN 978-952-99525-1-9.
- Mäkelä, Pia; Mustonen, Heli; Tigerstedt, Christoffer: Suomi juo: Suomalaisten alkoholinkäyttö ja sen muutokset 1968–2008. Helsinki: Institute for welfare and health, 2010. ISBN 978-952-245-268-9.
- Numminen, M. A.: Baarien mies: Tosiokuvitteellinen romaani. Helsinki: Kirjayhtymä, 1986. ISBN 951-26-3003-6.
- Peltonen L.: Olutkulttuurin uusi aika, 2016.
- Peltonen, Matti; Kuusi, Hanna; Kilpiö, Kaarina (ed.): Alkoholin vuosisata: Suomalaisten alkoholiolojen vaiheita 1900-luvulla. Helsinki: Finnish literature society, 2006. ISBN 951-746-823-7.
- Peltonen, Matti: Remua ja ryhtiä: Alkoholiolot ja tapakasvatus 1950-luvun Suomessa. Helsinki: Gaudeamus, 2002. ISBN 951-662-858-3.
- Sillanpää, Merja: Säännöstelty huvi: Suomalainen ravintola 1900-luvulla. Doctorate thesis, University of Tampere. Helsinki: Finnish literature society, 2002. ISBN 951-746-352-9.
- Terinkoski T.: Miten alkoholikulttuuri on kehittynyt Suomessa? A3 Paneelikeskustelu osa 1/4, Ajankohtainen Kolmonen, 2016.
- Tigerstedt, Christoffer (ed.): Nuoret ja alkoholi. Helsinki: Association for alcohol and drugs research, Youth research association, 2007. ISBN 978-952-92-1938-4.
- Tikkanen, Unto: Viinin ja oluen lähteillä. Helsinki: Tammi, 2004. ISBN 951-31-3071-1.
- Wuorinen, John H. 1931. The Prohibition Experiment in Finland. Columbia University Press.
