= Social impact of the COVID-19 pandemic =

Indirect effects of the COVID-19 pandemic

The COVID-19 pandemic has had far-reaching consequences beyond the spread of the disease itself and efforts to quarantine it, including political, cultural, and social implications.

== Political impacts ==
A number of provincial-level administrators of the Chinese Communist Party (CCP) were dismissed over their handling of the quarantine efforts in Central China, a sign of discontent with the political establishment's response to the outbreak in those regions. Some experts, such as political scientists Dali Yang and Willy Wo-Lap Lam, believed this to likely be a move to protect Communist Party general secretary Xi Jinping from people's anger over the coronavirus pandemic. A news report published by the Financial Times expressed that outcry over the disease was a rare instance of protest against the CCP in China. Additionally, protests in the special administrative region of Hong Kong have strengthened due to fears of immigration from mainland China. Taiwan has also voiced concern over being included in any travel ban involving the People's Republic of China (PRC) due to the "one-China policy" and its disputed political status. Further afield, the treasurer of Australia was unable to keep a pledge to maintain a fiscal surplus due to the effect of the coronavirus on the economy. A number of countries have been using the outbreak to show their support to China, such as when Prime Minister Hun Sen of Cambodia made a special visit to China with an aim to showcase Cambodia's support to China in fighting the outbreak of the epidemic.

The United States president Donald Trump was criticised for his response to the pandemic. He was accused of making several misleading or false claims, of failing to provide adequate information, and of downplaying the pandemic's significance. Trump was also criticised for having closed down the global health security unit of the United States National Security Council, which was founded to prepare the government for potential pandemics. Research suggests that the pandemic was a contributing factor to his failure to win reelection in the 2020 United States presidential election.

The Government of the Islamic Republic of Iran was heavily affected by the virus, with at least two dozen members (approximately 10%) of the Iranian legislature being infected, as well as at least 15 other current or former top government officials, including the vice-president. Advisers to Ali Khamenei and Mohammad Javad Zarif have died from the disease. The spread of the virus has raised questions about the future survival of the regime and continuity of operations.

=== Sovereignty ===
M. Nicolas Firzli, director of the World Pensions Council (WPC) and advisory-board member at the World Bank Global Infrastructure Facility (GIF), refers to the pandemic as "the Greater Financial Crisis", that will "bring to the surface pent-up financial and geopolitical dysfunctions ... [many] national economies will suffer as a result, and their political sovereignty itself may be severely eroded".

=== Civil rights and democracy ===
In April 2020, UN High Commissioner for Human Rights Michelle Bachelet warned that using states of emergency during the pandemic "should not be a weapon governments can wield to quash dissent, control the population, and even perpetuate their time in power". According to the OHCHR, around 80 countries already declared some form of state of emergency, with the most severe being among Nigeria, Kenya, South Africa, the Philippines, Iran, Jordan, Morocco, Sri Lanka, Cambodia, Uzbekistan, Peru, Honduras, El Salvador, the Dominican Republic, Uzbekistan, and Hungary.

Iran, Jordan, Morocco, Oman, and Yemen banned or suspended the printing and distribution of newspapers. On 30 March 2020, the parliament of Hungary granted Prime Minister Viktor Orbán the power to rule by decree for an indefinite period.

=== Conflicts ===
The pandemic appears to have worsened conflict dynamics; it has also led to a United Nations Security Council resolution demanding a global ceasefire. On March 23, 2020, United Nations Secretary-General António Guterres issued an appeal for a global ceasefire as part of the United Nations' response to the pandemic. On 24 June 2020, 170 UN Member States and Observers signed a non-binding statement in support of the appeal, rising to 172 on 25 June 2020. On 1 July 2020, the UN Security Council passed resolution S/RES/2532 (2020), demanding a "general and immediate cessation of hostilities in all situations on its agenda," expressing support for "the efforts undertaken by the Secretary-General and his Special Representatives and Special Envoys in that respect," calling for "all parties to armed conflicts to engage immediately in a durable humanitarian pause" of at least 90 consecutive days, and calling for greater international cooperation to address the pandemic.

== Educational impact ==
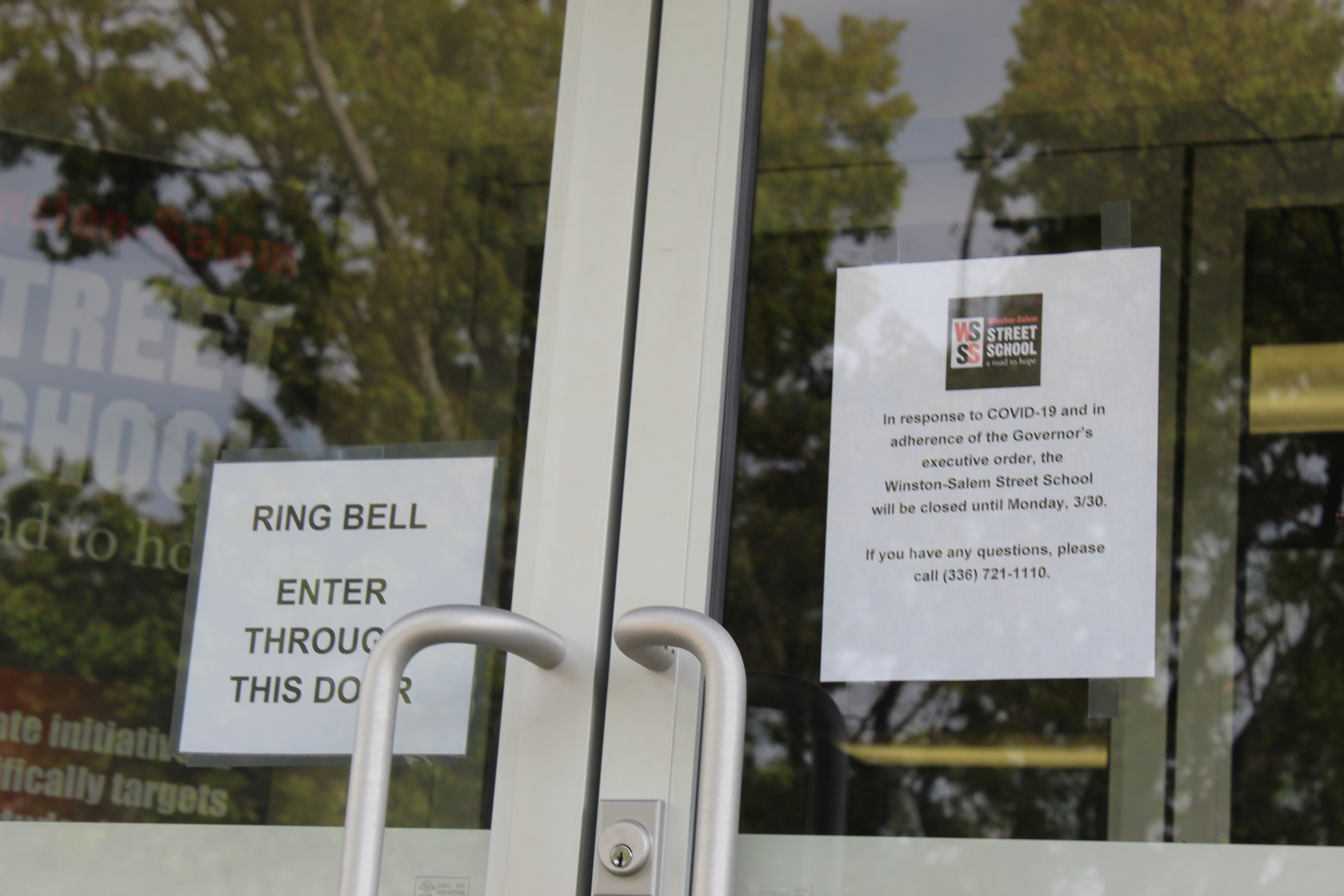
A sign on a local school closed because of the coronavirus

The pandemic has affected educational systems worldwide, leading to the widespread closures of schools and universities. According to data released by UNESCO on 25 March, school and university closures due to COVID-19 were implemented nationwide in 165 countries. Including localized closures, this affects over 1.5 billion students worldwide, accounting for 87% of enrolled learners. Those higher education universities have also impacted their students by deciding not to stop classes but rather migrate everything to virtual. Of 195 students interview surveyed at a large university, their findings show that there is an increased concern in mental health of these students. During the COVID-19 pandemic, many people who were not connected to the internet lost access to health care and education. Production in all industries was seriously harmed.

== COVID-19 and inequality ==
Low income individuals are more likely to contract COVID-19 and to die from it. In both New York City and Barcelona, low income neighborhoods are disproportionately hit by COVID-19 cases. Hypotheses for why this is the case include that poorer families are more likely to live in crowded housing and work in the low skill jobs, such as supermarkets and elder care, which are deemed essential during the crisis. In the United States, millions of low-income people may lack access to health care due to being uninsured or underinsured. Millions of Americans lost their health insurance after losing their jobs. Many low income workers in service jobs have become unemployed.

Many people began teleworking during the pandemic, however teleworking has only been suitable for a tiny group of workers. Highly educated workers, usually in white-collar professions have been able to telework more than other working environments. For those still commuting to work despite the pandemic or other factors, transport remains vital.

== Religious impact ==
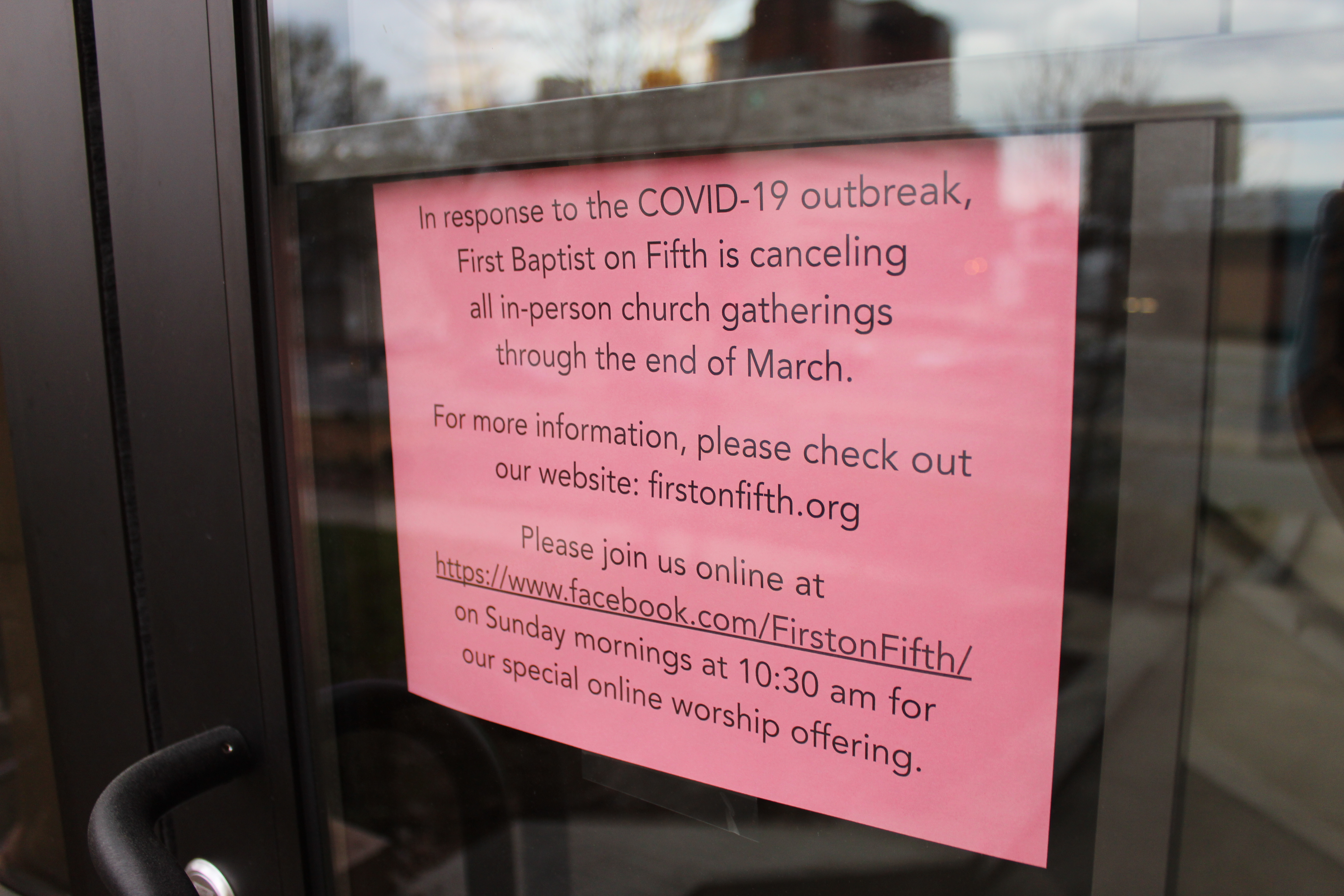
A church forced to close because of the coronavirus

The pandemic has impacted religion in various ways, including the cancellation of the worship services of various faiths, the closure of Sunday Schools, as well as the cancellation of pilgrimages surrounding observances and festivals. Many churches, synagogues, mosques, and temples have offered worship through livestream amidst the pandemic. Relief wings of religious organisations have dispatched medical supplies and other aid to affected areas. Adherents of many religions have gathered together to pray for an end to the pandemic, for those affected by it, as well as for the deity they believe in to give physicians and scientists the wisdom to combat the disease; in the United States, Trump designated 15 March 2020 as a National Day of Prayer for "God’s healing hand to be placed on the people of our Nation".

== Healthcare and COVID-19 ==
One of the social impacts of COVID-19 is its influence on healthcare. Two main changes in healthcare include the providers’ experience of patient care and delivery of care. With the start of COVID-19 pandemic, healthcare workers struggled to keep up with an increase in demands, a reduced capacity, increased stress and workload, and to lack of protective equipment.

COVID-19 changed the perception of patient care for providers. Research about patient care during COVID-19 suggested that nurses, for example, felt more confident in their skills and role in the healthcare team. Nurses viewed their profession as essential and felt increased pride in their services, as well as, patients and other healthcare workers gained a better perspective of the nursing profession. The close contact and extensive care nurses provided during the pandemic allowed them to appreciate the nursing profession. Moreover, the research indicates that nurses achieved professional growth, and uncovered a greater need to provide counseling services for COVID-19 patients to help cope with their illness. Additional research suggested a different progression to nurses’ caregiving during COVID-19. Initially, nurses experienced negative emotions associated with patient care such as increased fatigue and stressful emotions. Many nurses found self-coping styles such as teamwork and altruism to combat their fatigue. As the pandemic progressed, nurses developed a sense of gratefulness and self-reflection as opposed to the negative emotions during the initial stages of the pandemic.

Healthcare delivery is another aspect of healthcare that changed during the pandemic. Most healthcare providers transitioned to providing virtual or telemedicine visits in place of traditional office visits. One study found that psychiatrists faced some barriers using telemedicine such as lack of non-verbal clues, access to internet issues, and environmental distraction. However, the overall transition to telemedicine was positive and successful, even though many patients and providers still prefer in-person interaction.

For healthcare providers, there is a shared feeling of responsibility, added challenges from working with COVID-19 patients, and finding ways to be resilient. As the research finds, COVID-19 placed healthcare providers in a new environment and with unexpected challenges. Providers experienced fears of helplessness, coupled with the obligation to know answers for their patients. Other common fears included becoming infected and spreading the disease to others. To mitigate these fears, the study suggested providing extensive and regular training to healthcare professionals.

=== Post-quarantine transmission risks ===
A current debate going on amongst the community involves the transmission risks post-quarantine. When COVID-19 reached the United States, the original required quarantine was 14 days of length, and later was shortened to 10 days, then 7 days, and eventually even 5 days in some places. Researchers have conducted studies using a variety of methods to analyze the statistical data behind the transmission risks. A group of researchers performed an experiment at numerous college universities, testing to examine what the post quarantine transmission risk was. From Harvard University, Duke University, Boston University, and Northeastern University, the post quarantine transmission risk after 7 days, was 13%. However, the difficulty with this is that some individuals may remain communicable as short as 4 days or as long as 14 days. Another leading factor to the post quarantine transmission risks that researchers discovered, was that the different variants of covid, had different levels of contractibility. After comparing the transmission risks from individuals with different strains, the Omicron strain was found to be the most communicable on day 5, but begins to balance out with the other strains in days 5-10. Having differing rates of infectivity for each variant can play a role in the amount of time an individual should quarantine. This is one of the many factors affecting the post quarantine transmission risks, and more research should be done before coming to a set conclusive quarantine time.

== Psychological impact ==
On 18 March 2020, the World Health Organization issued a report related to mental health and psychosocial issues by addressing instructions and some social considerations during the COVID-19 outbreak.

Due to doubts if pets or other livestock may pass on coronavirus to humans, many people were reluctant to keep their pets fearing transmission, for instance in the Arab World, celebrities were urging people to keep and protect their pets. Meanwhile, people in the United Kingdom tended to acquire more pets during the coronavirus lockdown.

=== Suicide ===
The coronavirus pandemic has been followed by a concern for a potential spike in suicides, exacerbated by social isolation due to quarantine and social-distancing guidelines, fear, and unemployment and financial factors.

=== Risk perception ===
Chaos and the negative effects of the COVID-19 pandemic may have made a catastrophic future seem less remote and action to prevent it more necessary. However, it may also have the opposite effect by having minds focus on the more immediate threat of the pandemic rather than the climate crisis or the prevention of other disasters.

=== Coronaphobia ===
Researchers have identified coronaphobia as a byproduct of the pandemic, where individuals have an excessive fear of contracting the virus that causes "marked impairment in daily life functioning".

=== Socialization ===
Crowd anxiety and apprehension to pre-pandemic behavior were normalized due to the virus and subsequent lockdowns around the world. Additionally, social upheaval and other stressors have resulted in hesitancy to be comfortable sharing the same physical space with strangers. In February 2021, Saturday Night Live poked fun at "post-COVID dating" after a year of isolation imagining the "weird quirks and behaviors we've picked up".

== Personal gatherings ==
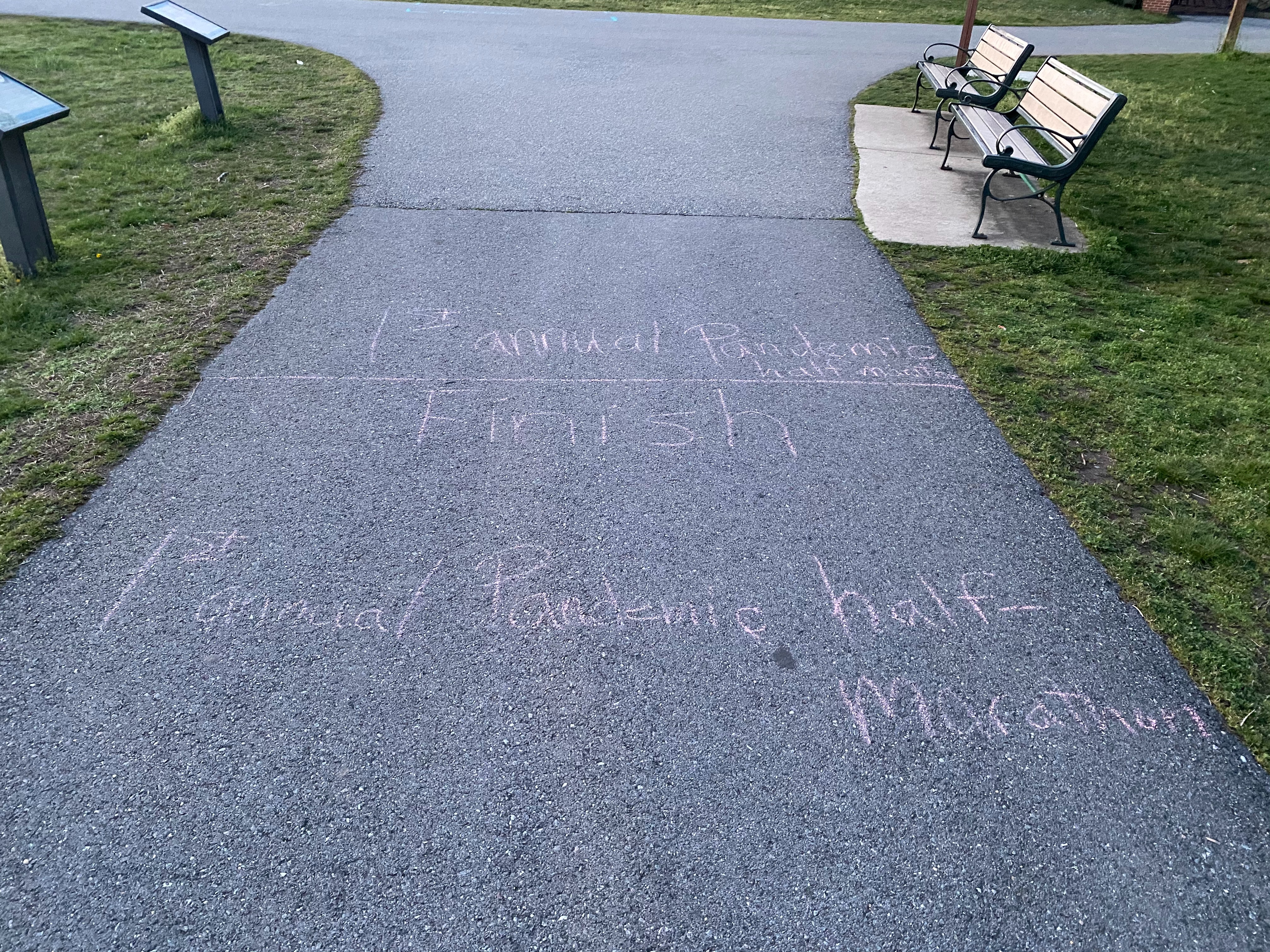
First Annual COVID-19 half-marathon finish line at Lake Artemesia, Maryland.

The impact on personal gatherings has been strong as medical experts have advised, and local authorities often mandated stay-at-home orders to prevents gatherings of any size, not just the larger events that were initially restricted. Such gatherings may be replaced by teleconferencing, or in some cases with unconventional attempts to maintain social distancing with activities such as a balcony sing-along for a concert, or a "birthday parade" for a birthday party. Replacements for gatherings have been seen as significant to mental health during the crisis. In Finland, social isolation among alcohol users has also adopted a trend towards Kalsarikänni or "pantsdrunking", an antisocial drinking culture.

== Domestic violence ==
Many countries have reported an increase in domestic violence and intimate partner violence attributed to lockdowns amid the COVID-19 pandemic. Financial insecurity, stress, and uncertainty have led to increased aggression at home, with abusers able to control large amounts of their victims' daily life. United Nations Secretary-General António Guterres has called for a domestic violence "ceasefire".

== Elderly care ==
Older people are particularly affected by COVID-19. They need special attention during the COVID-19 crisis, and their voices, opinions and concerns are important in formulating responses.

Global data are extremely uncertain at present, nonetheless, the heightened risks of COVID-19 for older persons are evident in all national data. The scale of testing and nature of reporting vary between governments and hence there is risk of misinformation by generalizing from the experience and reports of a given country.

While the number of older persons is relatively and absolutely smaller in developing countries, particularly in Africa, this coincides with other serious structural risks. Countries with the fewest older persons (such as many of the least developed countries), have the fewest health resources, limited experience caring for older patients (including few geriatric specialists), less institutional care for older persons, and far fewer public or NGO support structures for outreach, screening and community-based care of older persons.

Older persons living in long-term care facilities, such as nursing homes and rehabilitation centers, are particularly vulnerable to infection and adverse outcomes from COVID-19. Older persons who live alone may face barriers to obtaining accurate information, food, medication, and other essential supplies during quarantine conditions and community outreach is required. Older persons, especially in isolation, those with cognitive decline, and those who are highly care-dependent, need a continuum of practical and emotional support through informal networks (families), health workers, caregivers, and volunteers.

== People with disabilities ==
People with disabilities are at greater risk for contracting and dying from COVID-19. This is especially true for individuals with intellectual and developmental disabilities. Data from the United States indicate that people with intellectual and developmental disabilities are four times more likely to contract COVID and twice as likely to die from the disease; this is likely due to the fact that people with disabilities are overrepresented in care facilities where COVID is known to spread more easily. People with disabilities are also more likely to have co-morbidities that put them at higher risk for developing COVID-related complications and may have a more difficult time socially distancing due to their support needs.

People with disabilities are more likely to experience isolation and other forms of mental distress as a result of the pandemic. Women and children with disabilities are more likely to experience domestic abuse during pandemics.

School closures have presented children with disabilities with a host of challenges. Many children with disabilities have seen disruptions to critical physical and occupational therapies. Many of the assistive technologies people with disabilities use are not compatible with the platforms schools are using for remote learning. A large number of children with disabilities also live in poverty and may not have access to the internet and technology required for remote learning. These children may also experience a variety of social and psychological issues as the result of school closures, including food insecurity, anxiety, as well as delays in their development.

== See also ==
- Shortages related to the COVID-19 pandemic
- Xenophobia and racism related to the COVID-19 pandemic
- Distance learning
- Social impact of the COVID-19 pandemic in the Republic of Ireland
- Social impact of the COVID-19 pandemic in the United Kingdom
- Social impact of the COVID-19 pandemic in the United States
