= Roger Masters =

American political scientist (1933–2023)

Roger Davis Masters (June 8, 1933, Boston – June 22, 2023, Lebanon, NH) studied at Harvard (A.B. 1955, Summa cum Laude), served in the U.S. Army (1955–57), completed his M.A. (1958) and Ph.D. (1961) at the University of Chicago, and served on the faculty at Yale (1961-67) and then Dartmouth College, with a two-year leave to serve as Cultural Attaché at the American Embassy in Paris (1969–1971). From his retirement in 1998 he was the Nelson A. Rockefeller Professor of Government Emeritus in the Department of Government at Dartmouth.

== Academic career ==
Roger Masters made deep and wide-ranging contributions in social science. The central concern of his career was how the natural world influences human behavior, and creates opportunities for political action to improve societal outcomes.

Masters began his career in political philosophy as a student of Leo Strauss at the University of Chicago. His dissertation and subsequent book The Political Philosophy of Rousseau helped shape understanding of Jean-Jacques Rousseau's role in modern political thought. He translated and edited influential new editions of Rousseau's works (The First and Second Discourses and On the Social Contract, with the Geneva Manuscript and Political Economy), and later co-edited the only complete English edition of The Collected Writings of Rousseau. The role of natural science in early political thought is also addressed in his 1996 book, Machiavelli, Leonardo and the Science of Power, and his 1998 book, Fortune is a River: Leonardo da Vinci and Niccolò Machiavelli's Magnificent Dream to Change the Course of Florentine History.

Masters' investigation of how nature influences human societies led to significant contributions in the field of international relations, as well as human ethology and sociobiology. This work included pioneering laboratory experiments in political communication. Later, Masters' research on biology and human behavior led to new epidemiological evidence regarding the behavioral impacts of neurotoxins, first on the consequences of lead poisoning, and then on the links between a common method of water fluoridation to elevated blood lead and a higher prevalence of violent crime, substance abuse and learning disabilities.

Masters' work has pioneered the application of natural science discoveries to the social sciences and government policy. He was a founding member and served on the Executive Council of the Association for Politics and the Life Sciences, and led a multiyear consultancy on biology and politics for the U.S. Department of Defense in collaboration with anthropologist Lionel Tiger and neuroscientist Michael T. McGuire.

== Published work ==
=== Principal books ===
- Masters, Roger D. (ed.), 1964. The First and Second Discourses by Jean-Jacques Rousseau, translated by Roger D Masters and Judith R Masters. New York: St. Martin's Press (ISBN 0-312-69440-7).
- Masters, Roger D. (ed.), 1967. The Nation is Burdened: American foreign policy in a changing world. New York: Random House (ISBN 9780394437996)
- Masters, Roger D., 1968. The Political Philosophy of Rousseau. Princeton, N.J., Princeton University Press (ISBN 9780691019895), also available in French (ISBN 2-84788-000-3).
- Masters, Roger D. (ed.), 1978. On the Social Contract, with the Geneva Manuscript and Political Economy by Jean-Jacques Rousseau, translated by Judith R Masters. New York: St Martin's Press (ISBN 0-312-69446-6).
- Masters, Roger D., 1989. The Nature of Politics. New Haven: Yale University Press (ISBN 0-300-04981-1).
- Masters, Roger D., 1993. Beyond Relativism: Science and Human Values. Hanover, NH: University Press of New England (ISBN 0-87451-634-X).
- Masters, Roger D., 1996. Machiavelli, Leonardo and the Science of Power. Notre Dame, IN: University of Notre Dame Press (ISBN 0-268-01433-7). See also NYT book review
- Masters, Roger D., 1998. Fortune is a River: Leonardo da Vinci and Niccolò Machiavelli's Magnificent Dream to Change the Course of Florentine History. New York: Simon & Schuster (ISBN 0-452-28090-7), also available in Chinese (ISBN 9789572026113), Japanese (ISBN 9784022597588), German (ISBN 9783471794029), Portuguese (ISBN 9788571104969), and Korean (ISBN 9788984070059). See also NYT book review and NYT news story.

=== Edited volumes ===
- Gruter, Margaret and Roger D. Masters, eds., 1984. Ostracism: A Social and Biological Phenomenon. http://www.bepress.com/gruterclassics/ostracism (ISBN 0-317-55376-3).
- Masters, Roger D. and Margaret Gruter, eds.,1992. The Sense of Justice: Biological Foundations of Law. Newbury Park, CA: Sage Publications (ISBN 0-8039-4398-9).
- Masters, Roger D. and Michael T. McGuire, eds. 1994. The Neurotransmitter Revolution: Serotonin, Social Behavior, and the Law. Carbondale: Southern Illinois University Press (ISBN 0-8093-1801-6).
- Masters, Roger D., Glendon A. Schubert and Albert Somit, eds., 1994. Primate Politics. Lanham, MD: University Press of America (ISBN 0-8191-9386-0)

=== Edited series ===
- Masters, Roger D. and Christopher Kelly, eds. (1990) The Collected Writings of Rousseau. Hanover, NH: University Press of New England (12 volumes, various years). Series includes:
  - The Confessions and Correspondence, Including the Letters to Malesherbes (ISBN 0-87451-836-9)
  - Dialogues (ISBN 0-87451-495-9)
  - Autobiographical, Scientific, Religious, Moral, and Literary Writings (ISBN 1-58465-599-2)
  - Discourse on the Origins of Inequality (Second Discourse), Polemics, and Political Economy (ISBN 0-87451-603-X)
  - Discourse on the Sciences and Arts (First Discourse) and Polemics (ISBN 0-87451-580-7)
  - Essay on the Origin of Languages and Writings Related to Music (ISBN 0-87451-839-3)
  - Julie, or the New Heloise (ISBN 0-87451-825-3)
  - Letter to Beaumont, Letters Written from the Mountain, and Related Writings (ISBN 1-58465-164-4)
  - Letter to D'Alembert and Writings for the Theater (ISBN 1-58465-353-1)
  - The Plan for Perpetual Peace, On the Government of Poland, and Other Writings on History and Politics (ISBN 1-58465-514-3)
  - The Reveries of the Solitary Walker, Botanical Writings, and Letter to Franquières (ISBN 1-58465-007-9)
  - Social Contract, Discourse on the Virtue Most Necessary for a Hero, Political Fragments, and Geneva Manuscript (ISBN 0-87451-646-3)

=== Principal articles and book chapters, by theme ===
International Relations

- Masters, Roger D. (1961), A Multi-Bloc Model of the International System. The American Political Science Review, Vol. 55, No. 4 (Dec.), pp. 780-798. JSTOR 1952527
- Masters, Roger D. (1964b), World Politics as a Primitive Political System. World Politics, Vol. 16, No. 4 (July), pp. 595-619. JSTOR 2009448

Political Theory

- Masters, Roger D. (1977), The Case of Aristotle's Missing Dialogues: Who Wrote the Sophist, the Statesman, and the Politics? Political Theory, Vol. 5, No. 1 (Feb.), pp. 31-60. JSTOR 191146
- Masters, Roger D. (1989). "Obligation and the new naturalism". Biology and Philosophy. 4 (1): 17–32. doi:10.1007/BF00144037. S2CID 143792647.

Human Ethology and Sociobiology

- Masters, R. D. (1973). "Functional approaches to analogical comparison between species". Social Science Information. 12 (4): 7–28. doi:10.1177/053901847301200401. S2CID 144594327.
- Masters, R. D. (1976). "The Implications of Sociobiology". Science. 192 (4238): 427–8. doi:10.1126/science.192.4238.427. PMID 17731068. S2CID 37927027.
- Masters, Roger D. (1982), Is Sociobiology Reactionary? The Political Implications of Inclusive-Fitness Theory. The Quarterly Review of Biology, Vol. 57, No. 3 (Sep.), pp. 275-292. JSTOR 2827464
- Masters, Roger D. (1983), The Biological Nature of the State. World Politics, Vol. 35, No. 2 (Jan.), pp. 161-193. JSTOR 2010269
- Masters, R. D. (1984). "Ostracism, voice, and exit: the biology of social participation". Social Science Information. 23 (6): 877–93. doi:10.1177/053901884023006001. S2CID 144839723.
- Masters, Roger D. (1990), Evolutionary Biology and Political Theory. The American Political Science Review, Vol. 84, No. 1 (March), pp. 195-210. JSTOR 1963637
- Masters, Roger D. (2009). "Mechanism and Function in Evolutionary Psychology: Emotion, Cognitive Neuroscience, and Personality". Psychological Inquiry. 6 (1): 65–8. doi:10.1207/s15327965pli0601_12.

Political Communication

- Masters, Roger D. (1981), Linking ethology and political science: Photographs, political attention, and presidential elections, in Meredith Watts, ed. Biopolitics: Ethological and physiological approaches. New York: Jossey-Bass. (ISBN 978-0875898513)
- McHugo, Gregory J., Lanzetta, John T., Sullivan, Denis G., Masters, Roger D. and Englis, Basil G. (1985), Emotional Reactions to a Political Leader's Expressive Displays. Journal of Personality & Social Psychology. 49(6, December):1513-1529. (ISSN 0022-3514) doi:10.1037/0022-3514.49.6.1513
- Roger D. Masters, Denis G. Sullivan, Alice Feola, Gregory J. McHugo (1987), Television Coverage of Candidates' Display Behavior during the 1984 Democratic Primaries in the United States, International Political Science Review. Vol. 8, No. 2, (April), pp. 121-130. JSTOR 1600686
- Newton, James S., Roger D. Masters, Gregory J. McHugo and Denis G. Sullivan (1987), Making up Our Minds: Effects of Network Coverage on Viewer Impressions of Leaders. Polity, Vol. 20, No. 2 (Winter), pp. 226-246. JSTOR 3234781
- Sullivan, Denis G., Roger D. Masters (1988), "Happy Warriors": Leaders' Facial Displays, Viewers' Emotions, and Political Support. American Journal of Political Science, Vol. 32, No. 2 (May), pp. 345-368. JSTOR 2111127
- Masters, Roger D., Denis G. Sullivan (1989), Nonverbal Displays and Political Leadership in France and the United States. Political Behavior, Vol. 11, No. 2 (June), pp. 123-156. JSTOR 586276
- Masters, Roger D., Siegfried Frey, Gary Bente (1991), Dominance and Attention: Images of Leaders in German, French, & American TV News. Polity, Vol. 23, No. 3 (Spring, 1991), pp. 373-394. JSTOR 3235132
- Masters, Roger D. (1991), Individual and cultural differences in response to leaders' nonverbal displays. Journal of Social Issues, 47(3): 151-165. doi:10.1111/j.1540-4560.1991.tb01828.x
- Warnecke, A.Michael; Masters, Roger D.; Kempter, Guido (1992). "The roots of nationalism: Nonverbal behavior and xenophobia". Ethology and Sociobiology. 13 (4): 267–82. doi:10.1016/0162-3095(92)90026-Z.
- Way, Baldwin M.; Masters, Roger D. (1996). "Political attitudes: Interactions of cognition and affect". Motivation and Emotion. 20 (3): 205–36. doi:10.1007/BF02251887. S2CID 143960723.
- Way, Baldwin M.; Masters, Roger D. (1996). "Emotion and Cognition in Political Information-Processing". Journal of Communication. 46 (3): 48–65. doi:10.1111/j.1460-2466.1996.tb01488.x.

Neurotoxins and Behavior

- Masters, Roger D., with Baldwin Way, Brian T. Hone, David J. Grelotti, David Gonzalez, and David Jones (1997), Neurotoxicity and Violence, Vermont Law Review, 22:358-382.
- Masters, Roger D., Hone, Brian T., and Doshi, Anil. 1998. "Environmental Pollution, Neurotoxicity, and Criminal Violence," in J. Rose., ed., Environmental Toxicology: Current Developments (London: Taylor and Francis), pp. 13-48. (ISBN 9789056991401)
- Masters, Roger D.; Coplan, Myron J. (1999). "Water treatment with silicofluorides and lead toxicity". International Journal of Environmental Studies. 56 (4): 435–49. Bibcode:1999IJEnS..56..435M. doi:10.1080/00207239908711215.
  - Masters, R. D.; Coplan, M. J. (1999). "A dynamic, multifactorial model of alcohol, drug abuse, and crime: linking neuroscience and behavior to toxicology". Social Science Information. 38 (4): 591–624. doi:10.1177/053901899038004005. S2CID 145745037.
- Masters RD, Coplan MJ, Hone BT, Dykes JE (2000). "Association of silicofluoride treated water with elevated blood lead". Neurotoxicology. 21 (6): 1091–100. PMID 11233755.
- Coplan, M.J. and R.D. Masters (2001), Guest Editorial: Silicofluorides and fluoridation. Fluoride. Volume 34, No. 3 (Aug): 161-164. (ISSN 0015-4725)
- Masters, R.D. (2001). "Linking Nature and Nurture". Annual Review of Political Science. 4 (1): 345–69. doi:10.1146/annurev.polisci.4.1.345.
- Coplan MJ, Patch SC, Masters RD, Bachman MS (2007). "Confirmation of and explanations for elevated blood lead and other disorders in children exposed to water disinfection and fluoridation chemicals". Neurotoxicology. 28 (5): 1032–42. doi:10.1016/j.neuro.2007.02.012. PMID 17420053.

== Other ==
- Dartmouth Faculty of Arts and Sciences. "Remembering Eminent Political Philosopher Roger Masters." https://fas.dartmouth.edu/news/2023/06/remembering-eminent-political-philosopher-roger-masters
- Appearances on C-SPAN
