= Socio-economic impact of the COVID-19 pandemic =

Socio-economic impact of the COVID-19 pandemic is covered by:

- Social impact of the COVID-19 pandemic
- Economic impact of the COVID-19 pandemic
