= Shouting (disambiguation) =

Shouting or screaming is speaking in a very loud voice.

Shouting may also refer to:

- Shouting (computing), in running text, use of ALL CAPITALS
- Shouting, buying a round of drinks
- Shout (paying), Australian usage
- Wang Shouting (footballer)
- Wang Shouting (politician)
