= Round of drinks =

Set of alcoholic beverages purchased by one person in a group for the whole group

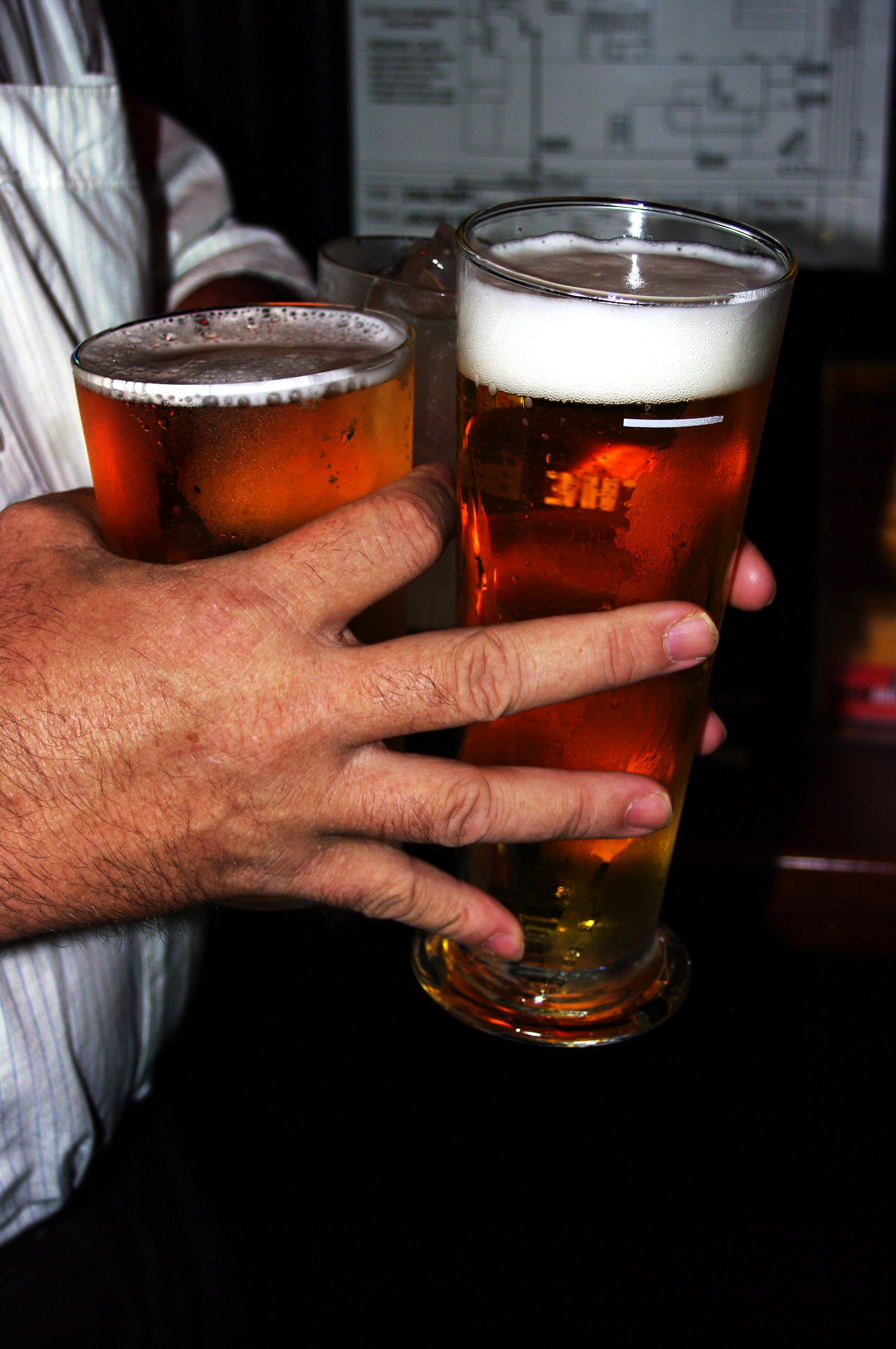
A round or Shout of drinks arriving at the table

A round of drinks is a set of alcoholic beverages purchased by one person in a group for that complete group. The purchaser buys the round of drinks as a single order at the bar. In many places it is customary for people to take turns buying rounds.

It is a nearly ubiquitous custom in Ireland, the United Kingdom, Canada, New Zealand, and Australia. In Australia and New Zealand it is referred to as shouting. This practice is also customary in many parts of North America, especially in areas where people with cultural roots in Ireland and the UK predominate. A notable exception was the UK State Management Scheme in which treating (i.e. buying a round) was forbidden, from July 1916 until June 1919.

== Greaves' Rules ==
Greaves' Rules is a set of etiquette guidelines common in the UK for buying rounds of drinks in English public houses. The rules were first defined by William Greaves (April 1938 - November 2017), a London journalist of the defunct Today newspaper as a Saturday morning essay in the paper, based upon his long experience of pubs and rounds. They immediately attracted a wide following in drinking circles and are known internationally as a representation of the spirit of drinking in an English pub.

When an individual arrives at a pub, common practice invites the newcomer to unilaterally offer a drink to a companion, with the unspoken understanding that when the drink has been nearly consumed, his/her companion will reciprocate. Trust and fair play are the root of the rules, though there are occasions (such as a requirement of one of the drinkers to need to carry out more important jobs, if any can be conceived of) where the rules can be broken, and were itemised by Greaves in his article. See, for example a copy of Greaves' Rules in the Oxford Pub Guide, with particular reference to rule 7 and especially rule 8.

Greaves' Rules is a lighthearted set of rules governing whose turn it is to buy a round of drinks in a British public house. The rules were first published as a Saturday essay in the now defunct Today newspaper but were later re-commissioned by the Daily Telegraph and published in that newspaper on 20 November 1993. Copies of the rules soon appeared in many bars throughout the UK and are now known internationally as a representation of the spirit of drinking in a British pub.

Kate Fox, a social anthropologist came up with a similar idea in her book Watching the English, but concluded their rationale was the need to minimise the possibility of violence between drinking companions.

== Australia ==
Shout (noun and verb), in Australia, New Zealand, and England, refers to an act of spontaneous giving. Its primary use is in pub culture, where one person in a group elects to pay for a round of drinks for that group. It may be that person's polite way of leaving the group to go elsewhere. In John O'Grady's They're a Weird Mob, Nino learns some customs related to shouting.

Your turn.

What is my turn?

Your turn to shout

Why should I shout?

Because I shouted you.

I did not hear you shout at me.

He thought for a while and said, I get it. When you buy a bloke a beer, it's called a shout, see?

Why is that?

I haven't a clue, but that's what it's called. I shouted for you, now it's your turn to shout for me.

I was only a little thirsty. I do not think I wish another drink.

He looked quite stern, In this country, if you want to keep out of trouble, you always return a shout, see?

Is this the custom?

Bloody oath, it's the custom. Your turn.

In Australian culture one person shouts the first round, then each in turn is expected to shout the next or if they wish to stop drinking the shout the round without buying themselves a drink. This is the sequence described in the Industrial Relations Court of Australia during the Garsid v Hazeltin Air Services(1997).

=== Other uses ===
By extension, shouting can refer to paying for another person's purchase; something they have chosen or will choose for themselves, as distinct from a gift or present. Typical constructions are:

- "My shout", perhaps to expedite a minor transaction, as when paying for a shared meal.
- "I'll shout you to the pictures"; "I'll shout you a new dress"
- "He shouted her to a slap-up meal"

Historically, the term "shout" was used by Rolf Boldrewood in A Colonial Reformer (1877), Henry Lawson in his poem "The Glass on the Bar" (1890), Jack Moses in Beyond the City Gates (1923) and Dal Stivens in The Courtship of Uncle Henry (1946).

== United States ==
In the culture of the United States Military, possession of a challenge coin can be used to determine who buys a round of drinks. One individual of a group lays down their coin, and all else present must lay down their coins as well. Anyone who does not have a coin with them must buy a round. If everyone can produce a coin, the challenger must buy a round.
