= Michael T. McGuire =

American psychiatrist (1929–2016)

Michael Terrence McGuire
- Born: 1929/1930; United States
- Died: February 1, 2016; Cottonwood, California, U.S.
- Education: Harvard University
- Medical career
- Profession: Physician, psychiatrist, researcher
- Institutions: UCLA
- Sub-specialties: evolutionary biology, biological psychiatry

Michael Terrence McGuire (1929/1930 - February 1, 2016) was an American psychiatrist who made contributions to the theory of psychoanalysis, biological psychiatry, evolutionary biology, sociobiology and the theory and practice of psychiatry.

== Career ==
McGuire was Emeritus Professor of Psychiatry/Biobehavioral Sciences at the University of California at Los Angeles. He was a physician, psychiatrist and researcher in the areas of ethology, evolutionary biology, central nervous system neurotransmitters, and the biological basis of behavior.

As a member of the Behavioral Research Institute at UCLA and Director of the Sepulveda Veterans Administration/UCLA Nonhuman Primate Laboratory, his primary areas of interest were nonhuman primate behavior, brain physiology, evolutionary theory, and ethology. A great deal of McGuire's published work in the last several years have been attempts to expand the application of Darwinian or evolutionary biology principles to areas such as law, healthcare, psychiatry and human behavior.

A significant amount of McGuire's work in the last few decades was to position developments in biology and evolutionary theory as tools to improve our understanding of politics, economics, and law. "[O]ur unimpressive record of understanding and forecasting political, social and economic events is largely a consequence of the failure to incorporate human nature into our thinking." Neuroscience and evolutionary biology have created new strategies for analyzing and understanding many aspects of human behavior, from mother-infant bonding to sexual selection. These and other scientific advances, McGuire writes, provide more exact information about human behavior, which in turn "facilitates a better understanding of which policies and decisions are likely to be effective."

In the preface to the 1994 book, The Neurotransmitter Revolution: Serotonin, Social Behavior and the Law, the editors, Roger Masters and Michael T. McGuire, state that new findings in neurochemistry and neuroanatomy offer valuable insights into human behavior. Numerous studies have demonstrated that in both nonhuman primates and humans, changes in neurotransmitter levels can lead to measurable changes in behavior, function and even social status. "Social scientists and lawyers will increasingly need to consider the ways scientific evidence can uncover chemical influence on behavior. Hasty conclusions by uninformed lawyers, journalists or politicians could do unforeseen damage to the fundamental principles of a democratic society."

McGuire posited that biologically-based insights into human behavior, the role of the environment on behavior, the role of technology (such as drugs, the technical means to prolong life) and the nature of culture and tradition could benefit our legal theory and practice. At the same time, he cautions that there are numerous moral and ethical issues at stake in redefining our legal institutions and the application of biological information should not compromise the legal process or overstep the boundaries of our scientific knowledge.

=== Darwinian Psychiatry ===
In the 1998 book, Darwinian Psychiatry, McGuire, along with co-author, Alfonso Troisi, make that case that psychiatry would be better served by utilizing an evolutionary model rather than the prevailing models (e.g., the psychoanalysis, behavioral, or biomedical models) for diagnosing and treating mental conditions. This position is not unique and has been set forth by a number of medical professionals.

The idea that human behavior can indeed be understood within the framework of evolutionary theory was first suggested in Darwin’s publication of The Expression of Emotions in Man and Animals (1872). More than one hundred years passed until these ideas entered mainstream scientific discussions. In 1975, E.O. Wilson’s Sociobiology was not the only major publication to address these issues, but it may have been the most controversial. Wilson posited that using the same tools and reasoning as had been applied to animal and nonhuman primate studies, we could identify and utilize the evolutionarily origins of human social organization, barter and reciprocation, bonding, role playing, communication, culture, ritual and religion.

McGuire & Troisi build a case for Darwinian Psychiatry as a science of human behavior, then offer evolutionary models of mental conditions including depression, personality disorders, schizophrenia, phobias, anorexia nervosa, suicide and others. The thesis that psychiatry can achieve the status of a science has its basis in a theory of behavior which has structured protocols and agreed upon methods for testing hypotheses. At the same time the attempted program is as complex and far reaching as the human subject itself, integrating genetics, physiology, ethology, behavioral sciences, psychology and sociology into an understanding of human behavior and mental conditions.

Darwinian psychiatry differs from psychiatry’s prevailing models in that the Darwinian model is based on a theory of behavior that applies concepts from evolutionary biology including: ultimate causes, biological motivations-goals, sexual selection, traits and trait variation, and the social environment. At least four ultimately caused (selectively influenced) behavior patterns or systems are thought to apply to Homo sapiens: survival, reproductive, kin assistance and reciprocation systems. A person’s mental health will be, in part, determined by how well he or she functions to achieve their often predetermined goals in each of these areas. The primary goal of therapy designed in an evolutionary context is to improve the individual’s capabilities to achieve these short-term biological goals.

==== Evolutionary Theory Applied to Disorders ====
The following are examples of evolutionary analysis applied to specific disorders:

- Depression. There are many models of depression in evolutionary theory, but the idea that depression may be an adaptive trait has a relatively long history and has been postulated in many ways. The model builds on the idea that depression has evolved as a strategy to respond to an actual or potential reduction in goal achievement.
- Personality disorders. As with some kinds of depression, some forms of personality disorders may be viewed as adaptive. Many individuals with Antisocial Personality Disorder for example go on to be successful by evolutionary criteria. The same can be said of many females diagnosed with Histrionic Personality Disorder. In both cases, their behavior can be understood as a high risk strategy yet they can be successful by evolutionary standard. Borderline Personality Disorder, Paranoid Personality Disorder and Narcissistic Personality Disorder are examples where it appears the individuals are attempting high risk strategies to achieve evolutionary goals but ultimately fail to do so.
- Schizophrenia. Schizophrenia is a loosely defined disorder and some have suggested that it is a genetic anomaly of relatively late evolutionary origin. The cluster of disorders classified as schizophrenia are minimally adaptive of achieving short-term goals, and gnarly show compromised information processing. Social understanding, social maintenance and manipulation are also compromised.
- Anorexia nervosa. The unusually high prevalence among females, the focus on physical attractiveness, and the use of strategies to avoid sexual maturation point to reproduction-related motivations and goals. Many of the beliefs and attitudes of the patient are related to social norms about beauty and fitness. Self-monitoring algorithms appear to be compromised.
- Phobias. Phobias are most parsimoniously understood as either adaptive responses or exaggerated, unremitting and minimally adaptive forms of such responses.
- Suicide. One should be able to predict that the incidence of suicide would increase when an individual perceived that their costs to kin exceeds the benefits to kin of their continued existence. Failure to achieve reproductive goals is another reason to expect an increase in suicide, and the risk of suicide should correlate negatively with the number of offspring. All of these predictions have been more or less supported in the literature.

==== Objections to Darwinian psychiatry ====
McGuire & Troisi address selected objections to the use and utility of evolutionary concepts to psychiatry.

- Objection: Evolutionary theory is a reductionist discipline that seeks to understand behavior and mental states as a function and process of genes. Such an approach is too limited and too unsupported with scientific data to be useful. Response: Darwinian Psychiatry is not a highly reductionist theory of behavior. In fact, Darwinian Psychiatry makes a strong case for the importance of learning, culture and social context on development and behavioral outcomes.
- Objection: Some theorists argue that the last period of intense selection for many of the present day traits of Homo sapiens occurred during a period of time between 100,000 and 10,000 years ago, called the environment of evolutionary adaptation or EEA. Homo sapiens has largely ceased to evolve genetically, morphologically or physiologically following that time period. Psychological capacities for mediating behavior rather than behaviors per se were the traits favored by selection during EEA and the selection favoring psychological capacities most parsimoniously accounts for human behavioral plasticity. Response: There is the possibility that Homo sapiens is still undergoing genetic change. Since Homo sapiens is recent in origin, speciation may be continuing both in terms of physical traits and mental conditions.
- Objection: Evolutionary biology can be fallacious when it proceeds by breaking an organism into adaptive traits and proposing an adaptive story for each trait considered separately. Response: Selection occurs on the level of the individual and not the individual trait. Less than optimal designs occur in part because the target of selection is the entire organism and not the trait itself. Selection does not optimize adaptive traits or strategies as much as it gradually eliminates unfit traits or strategies. We can measure adaptiveness by assessing the effort (costs) required.

== Selected publications ==
=== Books ===
- (1971) Reconstructions in Psychoanalysis (ISBN 0-39061-930-2)
- (1974) St. Kitts Vervet (ISBN 3-80551-692-4)
- (1977) Ethological Psychiatry: Psychopathology in the context of evolutionary biology with Lynn A. Fairbanks (ISBN 0-80890-988-6)
- (1993) Human Nature and the New Europe (ISBN 0-81338-719-1)
- (1993) Biology, Culture and Environmental Law (ISBN 9783428077328)
- (1994) The Neurotransmitter Revolution: Serotonin, Social Behavior and the Law Edited by Margaret Gruter, Roger D. Masters and Michael T. McGuire (ISBN 0-80931-801-6)
- (1998) Darwinian Psychiatry with Alfonso Troisi (ISBN 0-19511-673-9)
- (1999) The US Healthcare Dilemma: Mirrors and Chains with William H. Anderson (ISBN 0-86569-275-0)
- (2010) God's Brain with Lionel Tiger (ISBN 978-1-61614-164-6)
- (2013) Believing: The Neuroscience of Fantasies, Fears, and Convictions (ISBN 978-1-61614-829-4)
