= Sconcing =

Imposing a penalty in the form of drink

Sconcing is a tradition at Oxford University of demanding that a person drink a tankard of ale or some other alcoholic beverage as a penalty for some breach of etiquette. Originally the penalty would have been a simple monetary fine imposed for a more serious breach of discipline, and the word is known to have been used in this sense as early as 1617.

Minor offences for which a sconce might have been imposed included talking at dinner about women, religion, politics or one's work, referring to the portraits hung in the college hall, or making an error in the pronunciation of the Latin Grace.

== History ==
The power to impose a sconce was not originally given to all present at a dinner. It might instead have been reserved for the person presiding on High Table, or perhaps the senior Scholar or other undergraduate at each table. Anyone feeling a sconce was deserved would be required to ask for its imposition (often in a "scholarly" language such as Latin or Ancient Greek). Should their request be granted, a large vessel – usually full of beer – would be called for and the offender would have to attempt to drink it down in one go (perhaps while standing on the table). The amount of a sconce varied from two imperial pints (1.1 L) at Corpus, Oriel or Jesus, up to three and three-quarters imperial pints (2.1 L) at St John's. Several colleges retain impressive antique "sconce pots" in their silver collections.

In the event that a person failed to drain his sconce, he was generally required to pay for the contents. It was also once relatively common for the sconced person to choose to share the contents of the sconce with their neighbours at table, thereby making amends to the "victims" of the original breach of good manners.

== In modern times ==
Sconcing today is a phenomenon associated with 'crewdates', when typically a men's sports team and a women's sports team have a dinner together. Anyone at the table may stand and announce "I sconce anyone who ...". Those to whom the description applies must then stand and either take a drink or finish their glass. In this way it resembles the drinking game Never have I ever, but with focus on an individual, and no requirement for sconces to proceed around the table.

=== German fraternities ===
Fraternities in Germany, Austria, Switzerland and Belgium practice sconcing (called "Stärkung", "strengthening", colloquial for "snack") as a form of humorous punishment. A fraternity member may order a more junior member to drink beer ("Stärkt sich") at any time, for any reason. Sconcing rights are determined not by age, but by the date at which one is admitted into the fraternity as a full member after the pledging period. Thus, a younger fraternity brother may sconce an older brother who joined later.

The president of the fraternity and holders of high-ranking offices have the right to sconce even those considered superior under this rule, but can of course expect retaliation after leaving office.

The sconced person must finish his glass if he has one, or fetch a new beer if he has none. Sometimes, he may be ordered to drink an unusually large volume in one go, such as one or multiple Maß (1 liter), or a "Kanne" ("can", fraternity slang for exceptionally large implements, such as the famous "Octopott" of 1,8 liters). Especially during a Kneipe (a ceremonial gathering for drinking and singing, at least once per semester), the term "in die Kanne schicken" ("send into the can") can be used for sconcing.

The sconced person is expected to finish the drink in one go and as quickly as possible, just as in competitive drinking. The sconcer may at any point release his sconcee from his punishment by saying "Geschenkt!" ("gifted"), usually for good performance. One can also be outright sconced "ad satis", in that case the relief command is "Satis".

Sometimes, drinks other than beer are used. For example, a person who is intoxicated might be ordered to chug down a liter of water, often to restore the clarity of mind.

The main advantage of sconcing is that the sconcer must pay the sconcee's beer. However, trying to provoke sconcing for this very purpose is of course frowned upon and may result in the sconcee being ordered to drink a truly ridiculous amount as a deterrent.

== See also ==
- Hazing
