= Lionel Tiger =

Canadian-American anthropologist (born 1937)

Lionel Tiger (born February 5, 1937) is a Canadian-American anthropologist. He is the Charles Darwin Professor of Anthropology at Rutgers University and co-research director of the Harry Frank Guggenheim Foundation.

== Early life and education ==
Born in 1937 in Montreal, Quebec, he is a graduate of McGill University, and the London School of Economics at the University of London, England. He is also a consultant to the U.S. Department of Defense on the future of biotechnology. Tiger lives in New York City, and regularly contributes to mainstream media such as Psychology Today and The New York Times.

== Career ==
Tiger did not study biology or anthropology in college, only taking one class to fulfill graduation requirements. He developed an interest for anthropology while studying the decolonization of Africa. While in Ghana and Nigeria on a summer fellowship, he studied Kwame Nkrumah, Ghana's first postcolonial president. Tiger wanted to find out if Max Weber's theory of charismatic authority would be apply in the context. While researching, he was inspired by Weber's questions and new discoveries in Africa by Raymond Dart and Louis Leakey. Along with other studies that were being conducted at the time, including the discovery of DNA and that of research of primates in the wild, Tiger was inspired to do his own research on the human species, mainly that of human males and the way they interact with each other. He noted that animal behavior is often based on sexual characteristics (thanks to research conducted by Jane Goodall, Desmond Morris and Irven DeVore) and wanted to find out if there is a biological basis to social constructs and behavior. Tiger was fighting against the thought that "only humans displayed ongoing and intelligent agency." In 1969, he published Men in Groups, with Robin Fox as co-writer. The book introduced the term "male-bonding" and formulated the hypothesis that there is an evolutionary and biological basis to the "cross-cultural regularity of male bonds and groups." The book received criticism from the scientific community. After writing Men in Groups he went on to continue his research, bringing forward controversial concepts in his book The Imperial Animal and Women in the Kibbutz. One of his latest works, The Decline of Males has also come under fire for his controversial view of birth control for women.

== Controversy ==
Tiger's advocacy for men's rights has led to him being called by Kirkus Reviews "the mad scientist of biological reductionism". His books make controversial claims, including that birth control for women has emasculated men and forever changed the family dynamic, that when women use birth control, they are taking power and choice away from the men in their lives, and that women working outside of the home leads to men's earning less and no longer functioning as "effective providers." Tiger has received death threats, bomb threats and threats of physical harm, and his book The Imperial Animal has been compared to Mein Kampf by Maureen Duffy.

== Works ==
Some of Tiger's works have included controversial concepts, including biogrammar, the biological origins of social interactions and the limitation of culture strictly by survival necessities, based on the also controversial Noam Chomsky theory of universal grammar. Tiger published a work, The Imperial Animal, with Robin Fox in 1971 that advocated a 'social carnivore theory' of human evolution.

Tiger has predicted the higher status of women within society, in books such as The Decline of Males and Men in Groups. He has also written books such as The Pursuit of Pleasure, which discussed the concept that evolution has established the biological mechanisms of pleasure and that they have survival origins.

=== Books ===
- Tiger, Lionel (1969). Men in Groups. Nelson. ISBN 978-0-17-138007-1.
- Tiger, Lionel; Fox, Robin (1971). The Imperial Animal. Holt, Rinehart and Winston. ISBN 978-0-03-086582-4.
- Tiger, Lionel; Shepher, Joseph (1975). Women in the Kibbutz. Harcourt Brace Jovanovich. ISBN 978-0-15-198365-0.
- Tiger, Lionel (1979). Optimism: The Biology of Hope. Simon and Schuster. ISBN 978-0-671-22934-4.
- Tiger, Lionel (1987). The Manufacture of Evil: Ethics, Evolution and the Industrial System. Harper Collins. ISBN 978-0-06-039070-9.
- Tiger, Lionel (1992). The Pursuit of Pleasure. Transaction Publishers. ISBN 978-0-7658-0696-3.
- Tiger, Lionel (1999). The Decline of Males. Golden Books. ISBN 978-0-312-26311-9.
- Tiger, Lionel; McGuire, Michael T. (2010). God's Brain. Prometheus Books. ISBN 978-1-61614-164-6.(Co-authored with psychiatrist neuroscientist Michael McGuire.)
