= Robin Fox (anthropologist) =

British anthropologist (1934–2024)

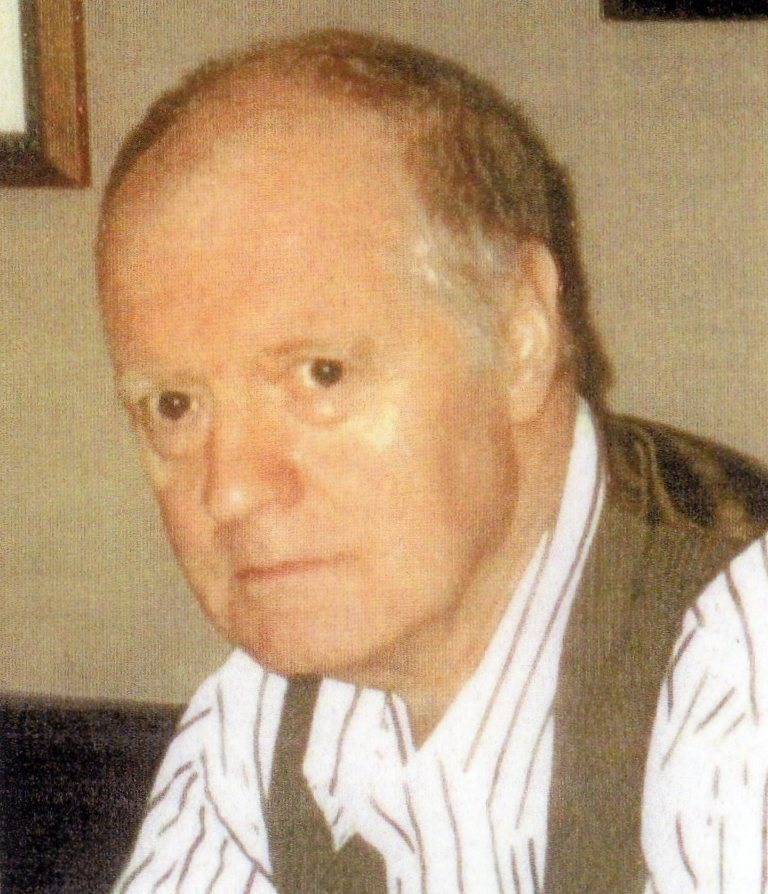
Robin Fox

Robin Fox (July 15, 1934 – January 18, 2024) was a British-American anthropologist who wrote on the topics of incest avoidance, marriage systems, kinship systems of humans and primates, evolutionary anthropology, sociology and the history of ideas in the social sciences. He founded the department of anthropology at Rutgers University in 1967 and remained a professor there for the rest of his career, also being a director of research for the H. F. Guggenheim Foundation from 1972 to 1984.

In 2013 Fox was elected to the US National Academy of Sciences (Anthropology and Evolutionary Biology).

== Life and work ==
Robin Fox was born in the village of Haworth in the Yorkshire Dales, at the nadir of the Great Depression in 1934. He had very little schooling during the Second World War, moving all over England with his soldier father (ex-Indian Army), and his mother, then an army nursing aide. Through a series of scholarships — one of them to the grammar school in Thornton, West Yorkshire - he made his way to the London School of Economics in 1953 and gained a first degree in Sociology with First Class Honours.

He went to Harvard for graduate work in the Department of Social Relations where he found himself under the tutelage of Clyde Kluckhohn, Evon Vogt, Paul Friedrich and Dell Hymes, in New Mexico, where he studied language and society among the Pueblo Indians. He concentrated on the Pueblo of Cochiti, on the Rio Grande, on which he wrote his PhD thesis (submitted to the University of London and examined by Raymond Firth, Edmund Leach and Daryll Ford). A revised version of the thesis with his analysis of the evolution of Pueblo kinship systems and the "Crow-Omaha" question, was published as The Keresan Bridge: A Problem in Pueblo Ethnology, 1967.

He returned to England, where he taught for four years in the department of sociology at the University of Exeter, starting fieldwork on Tory Island, a remote Gaelic-speaking community off the coast of County Donegal in Ireland. He wrote a museum-series publication, Kinship and Land Tenure on Tory Island (1966). His work on the island resulted in a book The Tory Islanders: A People of the Celtic Fringe (1978), for which the University of Ulster awarded him a doctor of science (D.Sc.) degree. He returned to the LSE for four more years, lecturing mainly on kinship, and publishing Kinship and Marriage: An Anthropological Perspective in 1967.

Fox had published a paper, "Sibling incest", in the British Journal of Sociology (1962), in which he revived the neglected theories of Edward Westermarck, coining the term "Westermarck effect". Under the influence of such figures as John Bowlby, David Attenborough (who was his student for a while), Robert Ardrey, Niko Tinbergen, Desmond Morris, Michael Chance and Lionel Tiger, he became interested in ethology. He gave the first primate behaviour and human evolution lectures in the department, co-teaching with the primatological anatomist John Napier from the Royal Free Hospital School of Medicine. He and Tiger wrote a paper on "The Zoological Perspective in Social Science" (1966). He added to it with his Malinowski Memorial Lecture of 1967 on "Aspects of Hominid Behavioral Evolution."

Rutgers University offered him a chair of anthropology in 1967, and the chance to start a new department, including Tiger. He and Tiger completed their joint work, The Imperial Animal, in 1970, a book that contributed to nature/nurture debate of the next few decades. He spent an academic year at Stanford University School of Medicine (Department of Psychiatry) as an NIMH fellow, studying behavioural biology and the brain with David Hamburg and Karl Pribram.

In 1972, the Harry Frank Guggenheim Foundation, through its president Mason Gross, ex-president of Rutgers, made Tiger and Fox joint research directors and started a program of support for work particularly on violence and dominance. They worked for twelve years with the Foundation, and during that time Fox did research with Dieter Steklis among macaque monkeys on an island off Bermuda and vervet monkeys on St. Kitts. He produced several books including Encounter with Anthropology (1973) Biosocial Anthropology (editor and contributor, 1975), The Red Lamp of Incest (1980) and Neonate Cognition (1984, edited with Jacques Mehler of CNRS, Paris).

During this same period he was a visiting professor at Oxford, Paris (Ecole des Hautes Etudes en Sciences Sociales), the University of California, San Diego, and the Universidad de los Andes in Bogotá, Colombia, where he did a "participant observer" stint as a bullfighter, studying the provincial bullfight culture of southern Colombia. In 1985 Rutgers made him a professor. He wrote The Search for Society (1989) his "equal time response" to the interpretive anthropology of Clifford Geertz, and The Violent Imagination (1989), a book of essays, verse, satire, drama, and dialogue.

Fox was then a Senior Overseas Scholar at St John's College, Cambridge, and wrote a series of related collections of his essays. The first was Reproduction and Succession (1993), relating his part in both the appeal of a Mormon policeman to the Supreme Court and the famous "Baby M" surrogate mother trials in New Jersey. Then followed The Challenge of Anthropology (1994), and Conjectures and Confrontations (1997). In 2000 he added to the material in The Violent Imagination, plus a foreword by Ashley Montagu, which came out as The Passionate Mind.

Fox wrote further books on the tribal basis of behavior, civilization and the savage mind, and the Shakespeare authorship question (Shakespeare's Education: Schools, Lawsuits and Theater in the Tudor Miracle, 2012). In 2013 he was elected to the US National Academy of Sciences (Anthropology and Evolutionary Biology). In 2014 a festschrift for him was published by Transaction Publishers and edited by Michael Egan titled The Character of Human Institutions: Robin Fox and the Rise of Biosocial Science.

He was married to Lin Fox, who taught Health Sciences at Kean University, New Jersey; they lived on a small farm outside Princeton, New Jersey. He continued to teach (American Indians, Origin and Fall of Civilizations, Comparative and Persistent Mythology, Incest in Literature) and to pursue research on the archaeology of the Calusa Indians of SW Florida, and the evolutionary relationship between consanguineous marriage and fertility.

Fox died on January 18, 2024, at the age of 89.

== Books ==
- The Keresan Bridge: A Problem in Pueblo Ethnology. London School of Economics Monographs on Social Anthropology. Berg Publishers. 1967. p. 208. ISBN 9781845200015.
- (with Lionel Tiger) The Imperial Animal. Holt, Rinehart and Winston. 1971. p. 308. ISBN 978-0-03-086582-4.
- The Tory Islanders: A People of the Celtic Fringe. Cambridge University Press. 1978. pp. 210. ISBN 9780521292986.
- Kinship and marriage: an anthropological perspective. Cambridge studies in social anthropology. Vol. 50. Cambridge University Press. 1983. p. 273. ISBN 978-0-521-27823-2.
- The Red Lamp of Incest: An Enquiry Into the Origins of Mind and Society. University of Notre Dame Press. 1983. p. 284. ISBN 978-0-268-01620-3.
- The search for society: quest for a biosocial science and morality. Rutgers University Press. 1989. p. 264. ISBN 978-0-8135-1488-8.
- Encounter with anthropology (2nd ed.). Transaction Publishers. 1991. p. 338. ISBN 978-0-88738-870-5.
- Reproduction and Succession: Studies in Anthropology, Law, and Society. Transaction Publishers. 1993. pp. 269. ISBN 978-1-56000-924-5.
- The Challenge of Anthropology: Old Encounters and New Excursions. Transaction Publishers. 1994. pp. 431. ISBN 978-1-56000-827-9.
- Conjectures & confrontations: science, evolution, social concern. Transaction Publishers. 1997. pp. 212. ISBN 978-1-56000-286-4.
- The passionate mind: sources of destruction & creativity (2nd ed.). Transaction Publishers. 2000. p. 331. ISBN 978-0-7658-0632-1.
- Participant observer: memoir of a transatlantic life. Transaction Publishers. 2004. p. 575. ISBN 978-0-7658-0238-5.
- The tribal imagination: Civilization and the savage mind. Harvard University Press. 2011. pp. 417. ISBN 978-0-674-05901-6.
- Shakespeare's Education: Schools, Lawsuits and Theater in the Tudor Miracle. Laugwitz Verlag. 2012. p. 183. ISBN 9783-933077-30-1.
