= Kate Fox =

British anthropologist

- Spouses: Peter Kibby (before 2004) Henry Marsh (m. 2004)
- Parent: Robin Fox (father)

Academic background
- Education: Trinity Hall, Cambridge

Academic work
- Discipline: Social anthropologist
- Institutions: MCM Research Ltd. Social Issues Research Centre
- Website: www.sirc.org/about/kate_fox.html

Kate Fox is a British social anthropologist, co-director of the Social Issues Research Centre (SIRC) and a Fellow of the Institute for Cultural Research. She has written several books, including Watching the English: The Hidden Rules of English Behaviour.

== Biography ==
Kate Fox is the daughter of anthropologist Robin Fox. As a child she lived in the UK, the United States, France, and Ireland. She studied for an undergraduate degree in anthropology and philosophy at Trinity Hall, Cambridge. In 1989 she became co-director of MCM Research Ltd., and continues to provide consulting services. She is now a co-director of the Social Issues Research Centre, based in Oxford, England.

In 2004, Fox married neurosurgeon and author Henry Marsh, having been previously married to Peter Kibby (during which time she was credited as Kate Fox Kibby).

== Publications ==
Fox has written a number of books, including:

- Marsh, Peter; Kate Fox Kibby (1992). Drinking and Public Disorder: A Report of Research Conducted for the Portman Group by MCM Research. Portman Group. ISBN 978-0-9518762-0-6.
- Kate Fox (1993). Pubwatching with Desmond Morris. Alan Sutton. ISBN 978-0-7509-0532-9.
- Kate Fox (1996). Passport to the Pub: The Tourist's Guide to Pub Etiquette. Brewers and Licensed Retailers Association. ISBN 978-1-899344-09-3.
- Kate Fox (7 October 1999). The Racing Tribe: Watching the Horsewatchers. Metro Books. ISBN 978-0-7658-0838-7.
- Kate Fox (2004). The Flirting Report. The Social Issues Research Center.
- Kate Fox (2004). Watching the English: the hidden rules of English behaviour. Hodder & Stoughton. ISBN 0-340-81886-7.
  In this book, Fox conducts experiments and uses participant observation to analyse the cultural norms of the English.
