= Social lubricant =

Substance or activity that stimulates social interaction

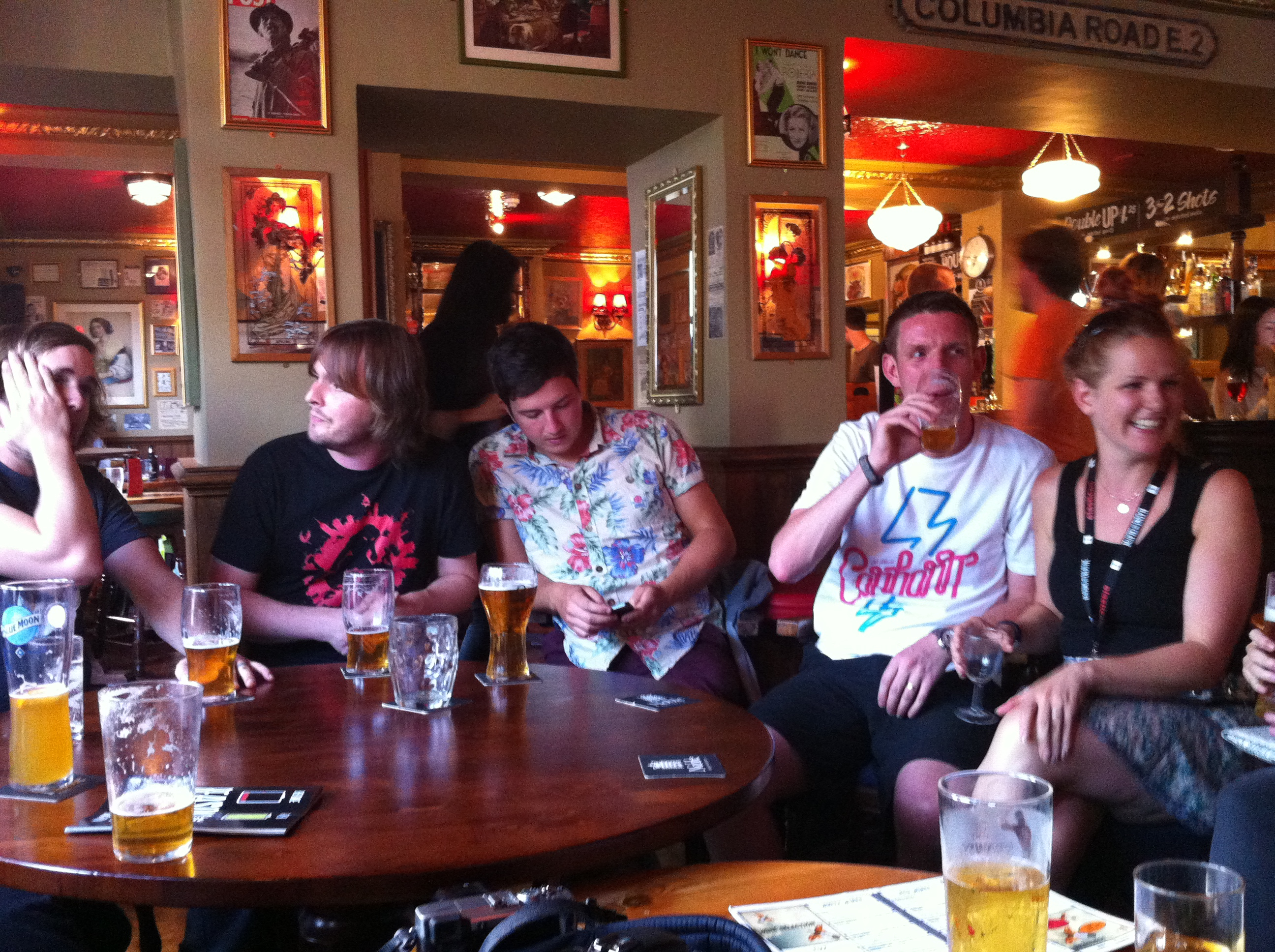
People drinking alcohol at a pub in Brighton, England

A social lubricant is any food, beverage, drug, or activity that stimulates social interactions or helps people feel more comfortable in social occasions. Different cultures use different social lubricants for this purpose. Some common social lubricants are:

- Humor
- Music
- Alcoholic beverages (beer in pub culture, or wine in wine bars, for example)
- Coffee (in coffee cultures, for example)
- Tea (at tea parties, for example)
- Tobacco (in cigarettes or a hookah, for example)
- Cannabis
- Dogs
- Small talk (informal discourse or conversation, for example)
- Campfires and bonfires

Social lubricant is sometimes used as a euphemism for a bribe or other improper payment.

Referring to alcohol as a social lubricant has been criticized because it has negative effects on empathy; alcohol has the potential to increase aggression and cause disputes or violence.

== See also ==
- Icebreaker (facilitation)
