= Watching the English =

2004 book by Kate Fox

Watching The English: The Hidden Rules of English Behavior
- Author: Kate Fox
- Language: English
- Subject: English social behaviour
- Genre: Social anthropology
- Publisher: Nicholas Brealey
- Publication date: 7 January 2014
- Publication place: United States
- Media type: Print (paperback)
- Pages: 228
- ISBN: 9781857886160

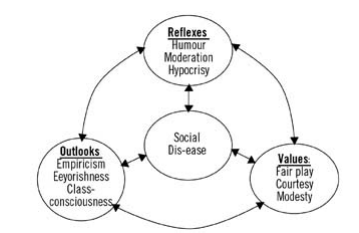
"Watching the English" scheme

Watching the English: The Hidden Rules of English Behaviour is a 2004 international bestseller by Kate Fox, a British social anthropologist. The book examines "typical" English behaviour.

The book was first published in 2004, and updated in 2014.
