= Harry Frank Guggenheim Foundation =

The Harry Frank Guggenheim Foundation was created by Harry Guggenheim.

The foundation writes: "He was convinced that solid, thoughtful, scholarly and scientific research, experimentation, and analysis would in the end accomplish more than the usual solutions impelled by urgency rather than understanding. We do not yet hold the solution to violence, but better analyses, more acute predictions, constructive criticisms, and new, effective ideas will come in time from investigations such as those supported by our grants."

Research grants are for the study of "violence related to youth, family relationships, media effects, crime, biological factors, intergroup conflict related to religion, ethnicity, and nationalism, and political violence deployed in war and sub-state terrorism, as well as processes of peace and the control of aggression."

In 2014, the foundation gave out the inaugural Guggenheim-Lehrman Prize in Military History to Allen C. Guelzo, for Gettysburg: The Last Invasion.

== See also ==
- Solomon R. Guggenheim Foundation which funds the Guggenheim Museums.
- John Simon Guggenheim Memorial Foundation which awards grants to scientists, scholars and artists.
