= Pantsdrunk =

Finnish drinking culture

Pantsdrunk (stylized as Päntsdrunk; Finnish: kalsarikännit, ˈkɑls̠ɑriˌkænːit) is a form of drinking culture, originating in Finland, in which the drinker consumes alcoholic drinks at home dressed in very little clothing, usually underwear, with no intention of going out. To a large extent, it is still considered a way of life in Finland, possibly related to the stereotyped lack of social contacts among Finns. The forced isolation of people in their own homes caused by the COVID-19 pandemic created a global trend for this drinking habit.

== In popular culture ==
Books detailing the method and philosophy of "pantsdrunking" have been written, the most notable being Päntsdrunk (Kalsarikänni): The Finnish Path to Relaxation (Drinking at Home, Alone, in Your Underwear) written by Miska Rantanen, and published in 2018. The Australian brewery Two Birds Brewing launched a line of beers called Kalsarikännit in 2020.

The Finland Promotion Board, operated by Finland's Ministry for Foreign Affairs, published a set of Finnish national emojis, which included male and female Kalsarikännit figures. It defined Kalsarikännit as "The feeling when you are going to get drunk home alone in your underwear – with no intention of going out."

The 2023 video game Alan Wake 2, created by Finnish developer Remedy Entertainment, includes several comedic in-game advertisements with two Finnish-American brothers Jaakko and Ilmo, one of which uses pantsdrunk to advertise a fictional beer called Ahma.

In "Frinkenstein's Monster", the 11th episode of the 35th season of The Simpsons series, pantsdrunk is mentioned by its Finnish name, when Homer Simpson claims that he did kalsarikännit before it was cool.

== See also ==
- Alcohol (drug)
- Drinking in Finland
- Finnish alcohol culture
