= August Wilson Theatre =

Broadway theater in Manhattan, New York

- Guild Theatre, ANTA Theatre, Virginia Theatre
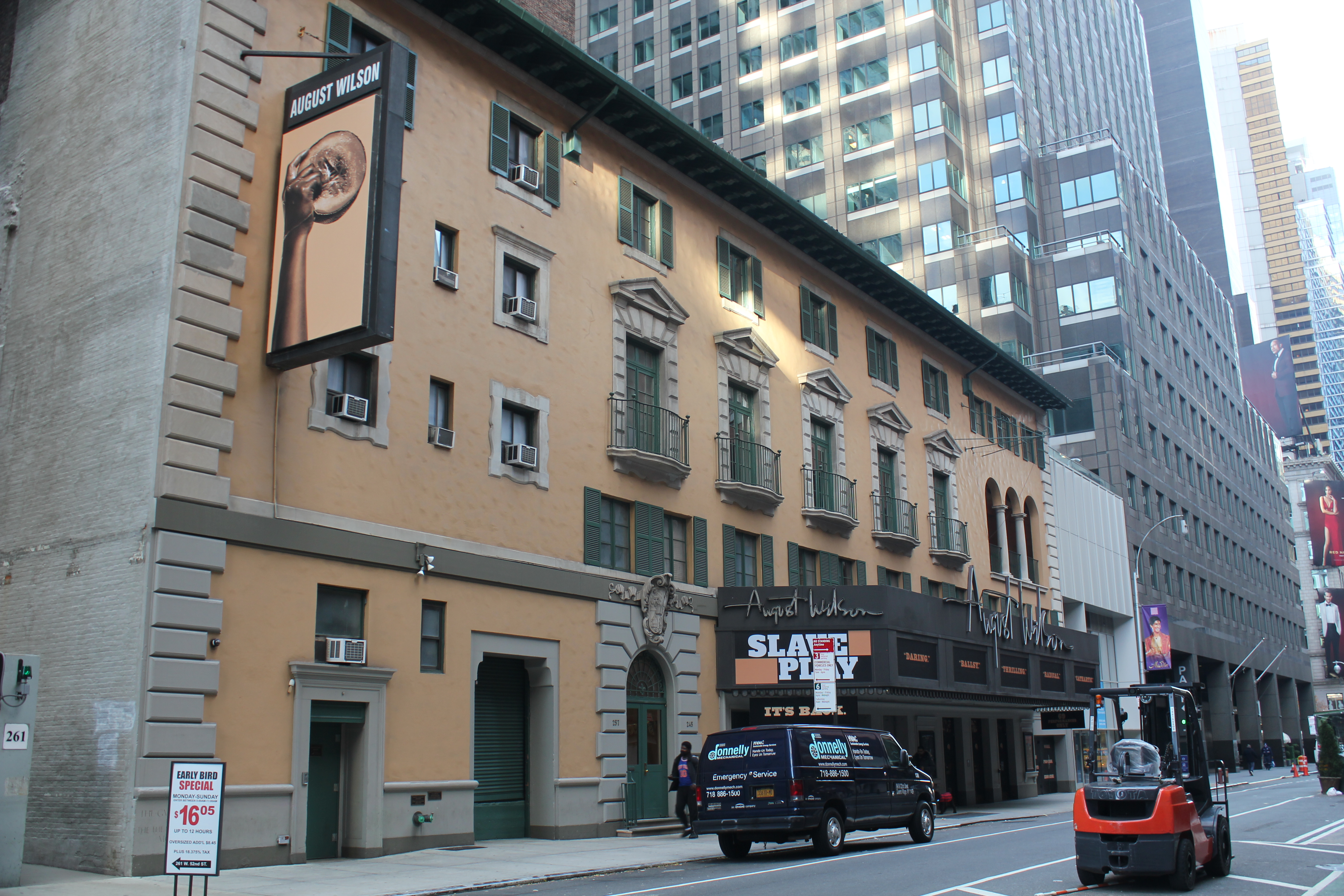
- Showing Slave Play, 2021
- Interactive map of August Wilson Theatre
- Address: 245 West 52nd Street; Manhattan, New York; United States
- Coordinates: 40°45′48″N 73°59′03″W
- Owner: ATG Entertainment
- Operator: ATG Entertainment
- Capacity: 1,222
- Type: Broadway
- Production: Paranormal Activity

Construction
- Opened: April 13, 1925 (101 years ago)
- Years active: 1925–1943, 1950–present
- Architects: C. Howard Crane and Kenneth Franzheim

Website
- us.atgtickets.com/venues/august-wilson-theatre/

The August Wilson Theatre (formerly the Guild Theatre, ANTA Theatre, and Virginia Theatre) is a Broadway theater at 245 West 52nd Street in the Theater District of Midtown Manhattan in New York City, New York, U.S. Opened in 1925, the theater was designed by C. Howard Crane and Kenneth Franzheim and was built for the Theatre Guild. It is named for Pulitzer Prize-winning playwright August Wilson (1945–2005). The August Wilson has approximately 1,225 seats across two levels and is operated by ATG Entertainment. The facade is a New York City designated landmark.

The facade is designed as a variation of a 15th-century Tuscan villa, with a stage house to the west and an auditorium to the east. The facade has a stucco surface and openings with quoins, as well as a loggia. The placement of window openings reflected the theater's original interior arrangement. The front of the theater had facilities for the Theatre Guild, including classrooms, studios, a club room, a library, and a book store. The rear of the theater contains the auditorium, which was placed one story above ground to make room for a lounge below. The auditorium originally had elaborate decorations, including loggias and a frieze with depictions of scenes from the Theatre Guild's plays.

The Theatre Guild announced plans for its own theater in 1923, and the Guild Theatre opened on April 13, 1925. The theater's initial productions generally lasted only for several weeks, and the Theatre Guild started leasing the venue to other producers in 1938. Radio station WOR (AM) took over the auditorium as a broadcast studio in 1943, with the Theatre Guild moving out the next year. The American National Theater and Academy (ANTA) purchased the theater in 1950 and renamed it the ANTA Playhouse. The theater reopened as the ANTA Theatre in 1954 after a renovation that eliminated most of the interior detail. Jujamcyn Theaters purchased the ANTA Theatre in 1981 and renamed it for Virginia McKnight Binger, a co-owner. The Virginia was renovated again in the 1990s, and it was renamed for Wilson in 2005. Under Jujamcyn's ownership, productions such as City of Angels, Smokey Joe's Cafe, and Jersey Boys have had hundreds of performances at the theater. Jujamcyn merged in 2023 with ATG, which continued to operate the theater.

== Site ==
The August Wilson Theatre is on 245 West 52nd Street, on the north sidewalk between Eighth Avenue and Broadway, in the Midtown Manhattan neighborhood of New York City, New York, U.S. The rectangular land lot covers 13,125 ft^{2} (1,219.4 m^{2}), with a frontage of 130.75 ft (39.85 m) on 52nd Street and a depth of 100 ft (30 m). The August Wilson shares the block with the ARO skyscraper to the northwest and Broadway Theatre to the northeast. Other nearby buildings include Studio 54 to the north, the New York Jazz Museum and the Ed Sullivan Theater to the northeast, 810 Seventh Avenue to the east, the Mark Hellinger Theatre and Gallagher's Steakhouse to the southeast, and the Neil Simon Theatre to the south. The theater replaced nine old residential buildings.

== Design ==
The August Wilson Theatre (previously the Guild Theatre, ANTA Theatre, and Virginia Theatre) was designed by C. Howard Crane, Kenneth Franzheim, and Charles H. Bettis. It was constructed in 1924 for the Theatre Guild, a theatrical society. Set designer Norman Bel Geddes was also involved in the August Wilson's interior design. The theater was erected by the O'Day Construction Company, and numerous other contractors participated in the theater's construction.

=== Facade ===
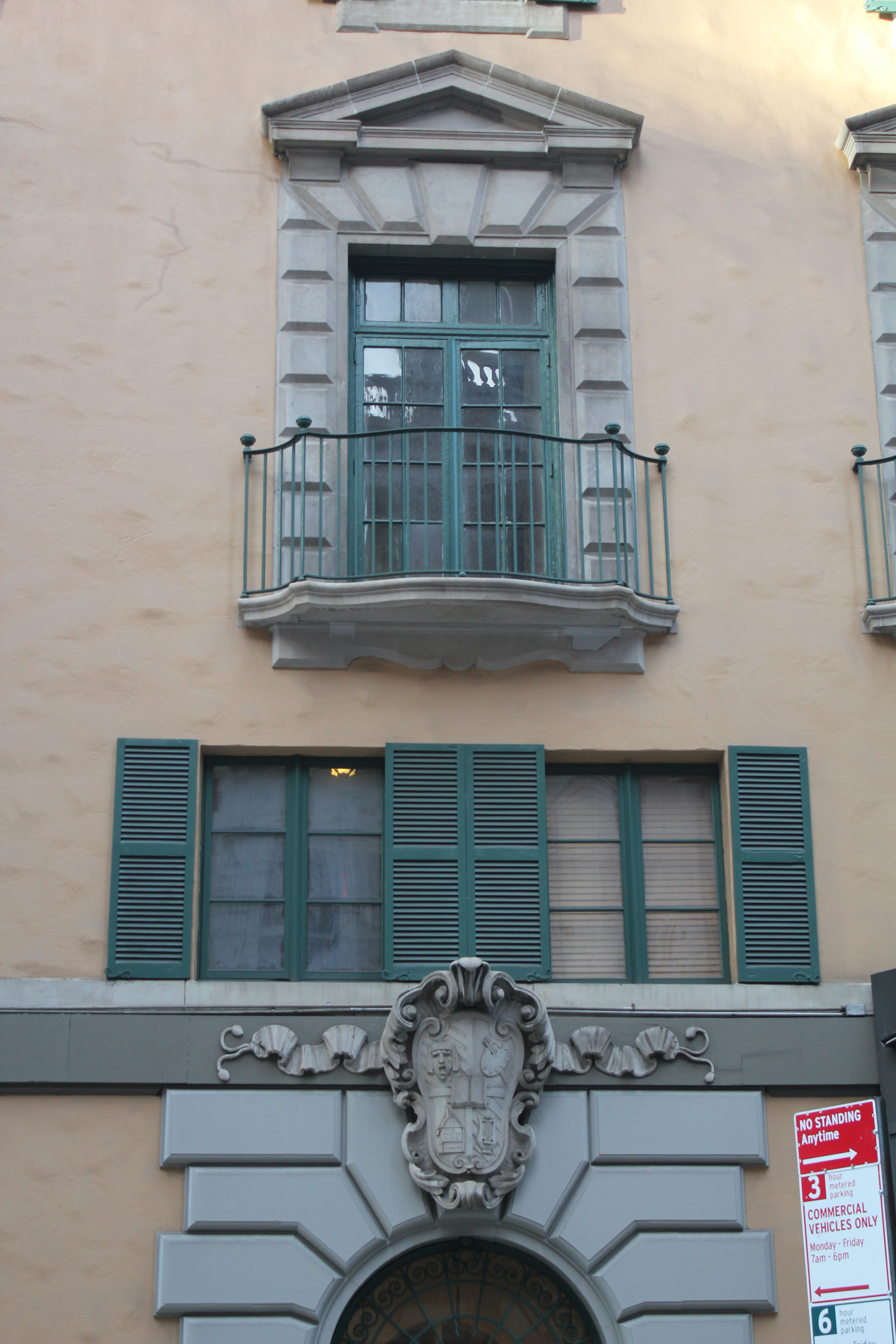
A portion of the stage house facade. The entrance arch with rusticated limestone voussoirs is at ground level. Above these are casement windows with shutters on the second story, as well as a French window with a small balcony on the third story.

The facade of the August Wilson Theatre was designed to resemble a 15th-century Tuscan villa, with a stucco surface and a heavy use of quoins around openings. On 52nd Street, the theater's height is shorter than its width. The extreme west and east ends of the facade contain vertical bands of quoins, while the rest of the facade includes stone-trimmed windows and doors. The placement of window openings reflected the theater's original interior arrangement. Architectural Forum described the openings as "picturesquely grouped in an informal manner to give quaintness and charm to the exterior design".

The western part of the ground story contains three doorways for the stage house. The rightmost doorway is an arch with rusticated limestone voussoirs; the arch's keystone is a cartouche with motifs signifying the arts, music, and tragedy. Within the archway are two steps leading up to a wood-and-glass double door, topped by a lunette window. To the east are wide metal doors that serve as emergency exits followed by narrow wood-and-glass doors that connect with the lobby. The lobby doors are flanked by sign boards, surrounded by large molded frames with console brackets below and cornices above. A single, modern marquee spans the emergency exits and the lobby doors. Originally, there were two marquees, one each above the emergency exits and the lobby doors.

Most of the second-story windows are casement windows flanked by shutters, originally painted blue-green. The exceptions are the westernmost two openings, which are slightly above the rest of the second story and do not contain shutters. On the third story, the westernmost windows are also simple in design, and a sign hangs next to the westernmost window. The center of the third story contains five French windows, each with a wrought-iron balcony in front of it. Each French window is surrounded by stone blocks and topped by a stone pediment. To the east is an arcade with three arches and an iron railing, which screen a fire-escape balcony. On the fourth story are windows with shutters, extending the width of the theater. Above the fourth story, brackets support a pitched tile roof that slightly overhangs the facade. The stage house rises above the western part of the roof, with a facade of plain brick. This was in keeping with many theaters of the time, which contained plain stage houses above their ornate primary facades, but Architectural Record characterized the stage house as a missed opportunity for decoration.

=== Interior ===
The front of the theater had facilities for the Theatre Guild, including classrooms, studios, a club room, a library, and a book store. The rear of the theater contains the auditorium. The auditorium was built one story above ground, as contrasted with comparable theaters, where the auditorium was at ground level. This enabled the installation of a large entrance lounge directly beneath the auditorium.

==== Lobby and lounge ====
The main lobby is accessed from 52nd Street and originally was a groin-vaulted space with Italian-style doors, ticket booths, and grilles. During 1993, the lobby was redecorated in the Art Deco style. From the lobby, there were either three or five steps leading down to the upper tier of a two-tiered lounge. The steps were made of travertine and were covered by a carpet.

The lounge, nearly as large as the auditorium directly above it, eliminated the need for patrons to go outside during intermissions. Its tiers differed only slightly in height due to the sloped floor of the auditorium. The lounge's lower tier was to the west of its upper tier. The two sections of the lounge were connected by a flight of three steps, spanned by three arches. There were two arched openings between the lounge's tiers, blocked off by iron railings. Both tiers originally had an ornate multicolored carpet, as well as wall fixtures that are made from the frames of antique Italian altar cards. The upper lounge had a barrel-vaulted ceiling covered in rough plaster. The lower lounge had Italian-style furniture arranged around a fireplace. The south wall of the lower tier had three arches leading to a small refreshment booth.

The lower lounge's north wall had an Italian-style doorway to a women's retiring room. This room had blue walls, frescos, and furniture in an Italian style, with paneled walnut doors leading to the adjacent women's bathroom. The upper lounge's north wall similarly had a large doorway leading to a men's smoking room. This space had red, green, and blue wall decorations with ornate carpets and furnishings. Next to the upper lounge was a coat room with blue walls and a Spanish doorway. A bookstore was also placed in one corner of the upper lounge.

To the east of the upper lounge was an archway, where a double stair ascended to the rear of the auditorium's orchestra and balcony. Similar to the stairs between the lobby and lounge, these steps were made of travertine and covered with a carpet. The stair hall was described as Italian in style, with a recessed window and seats on the orchestra-level landing. Doors from the landing led to both ends of the orchestra's rear wall. There was another landing at the balcony level. Both of these had intersecting vaulted ceilings with lanterns hanging from them. The stairs were infilled in the 1950s to create extra space for seats, and new stairs were added in the corners.

==== Auditorium ====
The auditorium has an orchestra level, a balcony, and a stage. Playbill cites the August Wilson Theatre as having 1,225 seats, while The Broadway League cites 1,228 seats. When the Guild Theatre opened, it was variously cited as containing 914 or 934 seats. (Note: According to Architecture and Building 1925, p. 49, there were 524 seats in the orchestra and 410 in the balcony, for 934 total seats.) The orchestra level is wheelchair-accessible via a stair lift; the balcony can only be reached by steps. The main restrooms are placed on the orchestra level. The original decorative scheme continued the exterior's Tuscan design. The decorations were completely removed when the seating capacity was expanded in the 1950s, although the auditorium's layout was not changed during these renovations. Barbara Campagna and Francesca Russo restored much of the interior detail in a 1995 renovation.

===== Seating areas =====
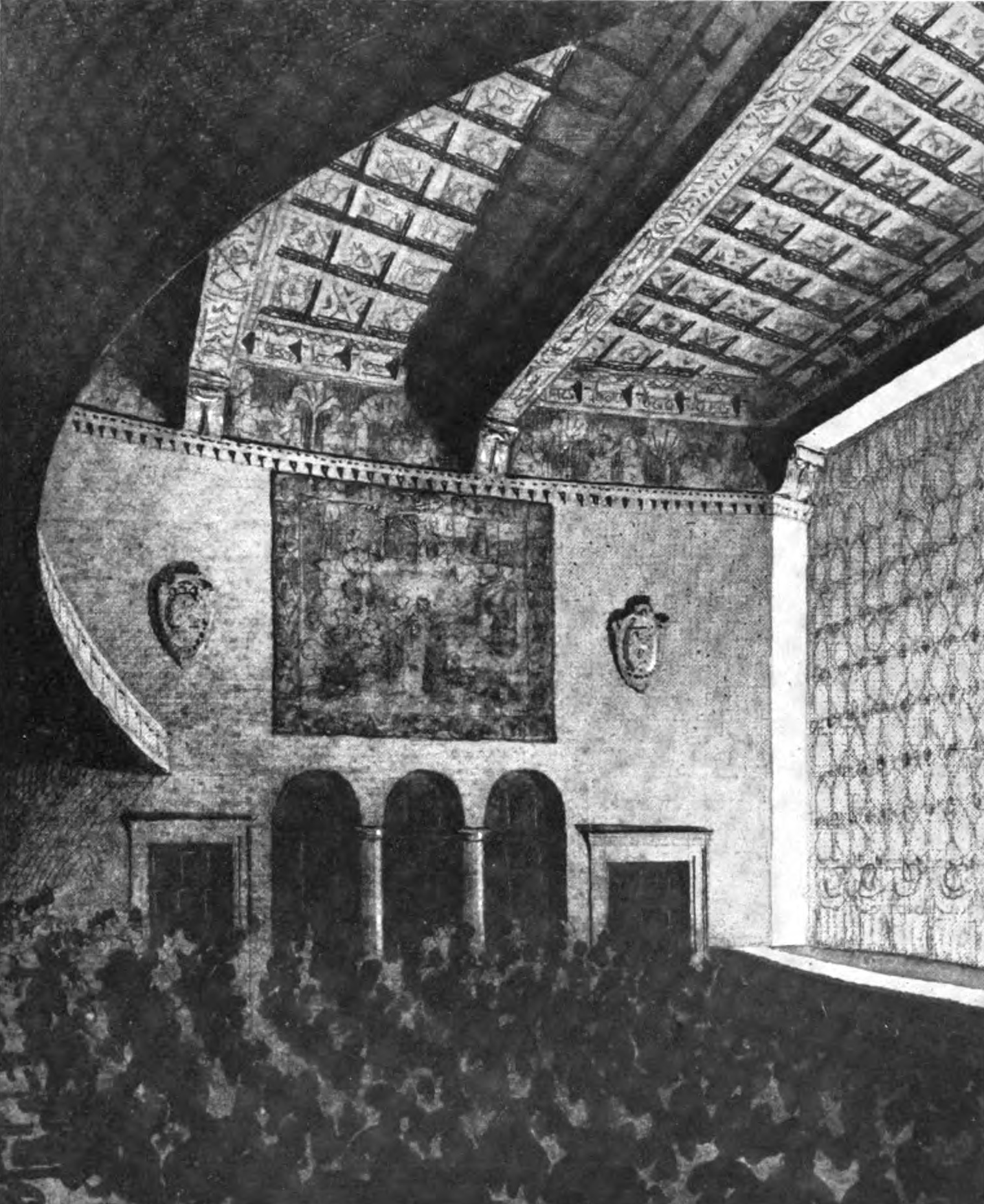
View of original auditorium decorations

The auditorium floor is raked, sloping downward toward the stage to the west. Unlike typical theaters of the time, the Guild Theatre lacked box seats, a design feature intended to give the appearance of coziness. It also did not have a traditional proscenium arch; the auditorium's side walls ended at the stage rather than curving in front of it, thereby creating an unusually wide opening. In addition to the former main staircase at the rear of the auditorium, emergency exits are placed to the north and south. Three arches on the south side lead down to an enclosed staircase to 52nd Street, while a door on the north side leads to a rear court behind the theater. At the rear of the auditorium, wrought-iron railings enclosed the stairways to the balcony. In the 1995 renovation, round columns near the rear of the orchestra were relocated, and the side walls were shortened.

The floors of the auditorium were covered with red and brown carpets, while the seats were upholstered in a brown and gold tapestry with red highlights. The decorative elements included rough-plaster walls with tapestries, loggias, and cartouches. The theater's tapestries and furniture included a combination of genuine antiques and reproductions. The wainscoting on the walls, as well as the entrance and exit doors, were decorated to resemble wood. At the orchestra level, the walls were wainscoted with octagonal panels that extended to the height of the balcony. A frieze, depicting scenes from the Theatre Guild's plays and important figures in the theater's construction, ran atop the auditorium walls. The frieze was designed by Victor White, Margaret White, and Stanley Rowland. The frieze ran above a band of modillions and was separated at regular intervals by massive plaster corbels, painted to imitate walnut. Since 1995, the modern auditorium's design has contained false balconies, exit doors, and a restored frieze. There is also green-and-gold carpeting and seats with orange upholstery.

===== Other design features =====
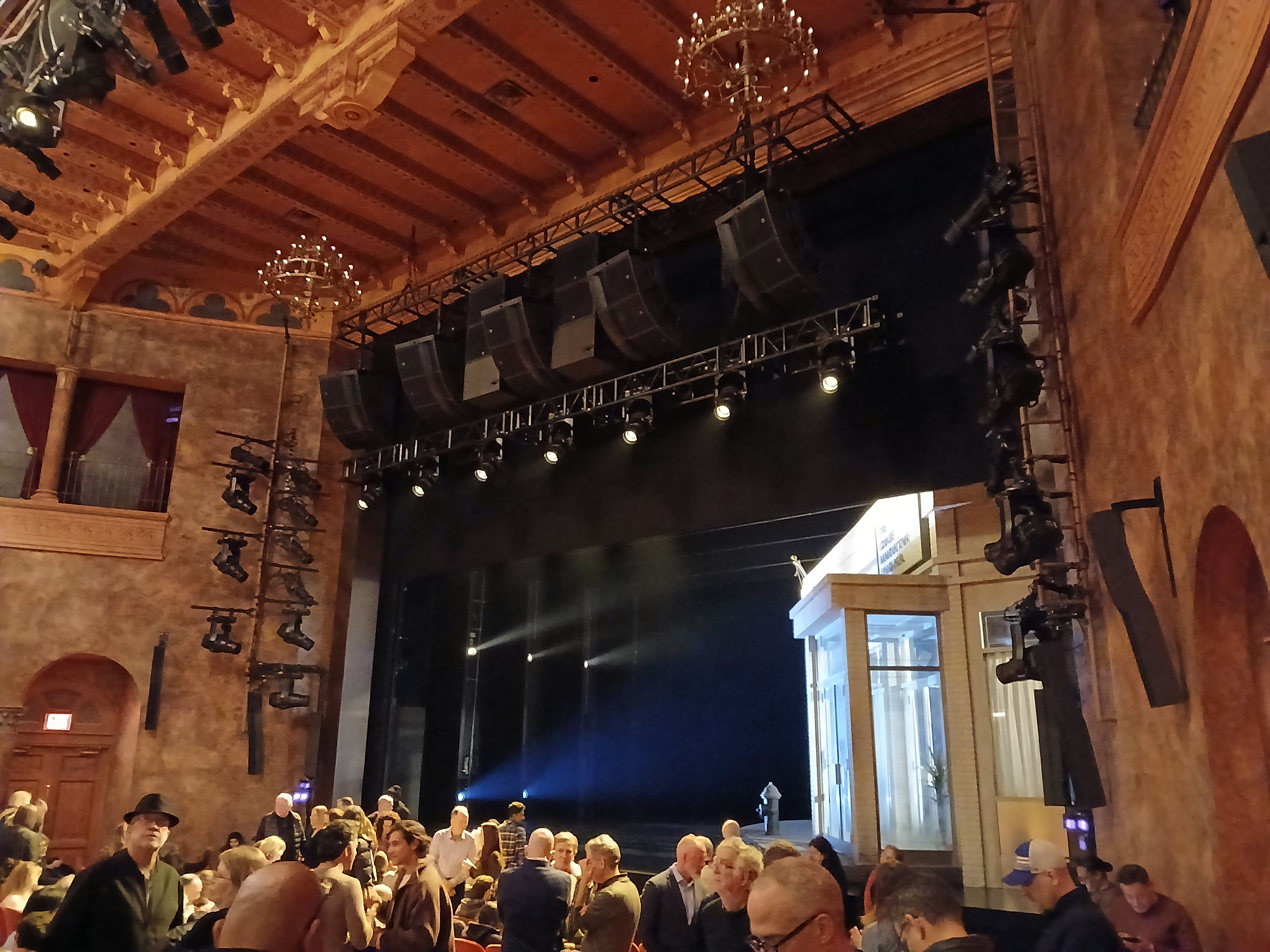
Modern auditorium decorations

The main ceiling had large beams and smaller transverse beams made of metal, decorated to resemble heavy wooden beams. The coffers between the beams were decorated in red, gold, green, and blue. Two metal chandeliers were hung from the ceiling; one critic described the chandeliers as containing "tulip shaped lights". The ceiling over the balcony had a different design, partially overhanging the orchestra. The balcony ceiling was made of milky green plaster with gilded stars and was lit indirectly by golden glazed discs. After the 1950s renovations, the ceiling decorations were totally removed and plain chandeliers were suspended there. After 1995, the balcony ceiling was painted blue, and gilded stars and white glass globes were added.

The stage is lower than in typical theaters of its time, extending over where the orchestra pit would normally be. This not only gave the impression of coziness but also allowed audience members in their first row to see a production without craning their necks. The stage opening is 38 ft (12 m) wide, and the stage itself measures 49 ft (15 m) deep and 77 ft (23 m) wide, making it New York City's fourth-largest stage when it opened. Traps were placed throughout the stage. The theater's large stage turned out to be a detriment, according to Lawrence Langner, a Guild cofounder. Langner reflected: "We made the ghastly mistake of providing a theater with all the stage space necessary for a repertory of plays without enough seating capacity to provide the income necessary to support the repertory". The modern stage can be extended by up to 8 ft (2.4 m) using a curved stage apron.

The Guild Theatre's cyclorama, the concave curtain at the back of the stage, measured 65 ft (20 m) high and could be retracted into the gridiron when not in use. A switchboard to the left of the stage controlled the lighting. A master switch controlled 156 dimmer plates and 200 switches, and the switchboard also controlled twelve spotlights in the ceiling. Scenery was controlled by a counterweight system on the stage itself, rather than from a fly gallery. The area above the stage's ceiling is 94 ft (29 m) tall, with the gridiron being 74 ft (23 m) above the stage. The height of the stage house and the gridiron allowed scenery for several productions to be stored at the same time.

==== Other interior spaces ====
On the upper stories, the front section of the theater building contained other rooms for the Guild. The executive offices were on the second story, while other offices were in the fourth story. The fifth story was above the auditorium and contained offices, rehearsal rooms for the Guild School of Acting, and a make-up room. These rooms were used for rehearsals, scenery painting, costume designing, sewing and repair work, and wardrobe storage. There is also an attic story underneath the tiled roof, which covers 1,800 ft (550 m). The attic's ceiling ranges from 4 to 14 ft (1.2 to 4.3 m) high, requiring some bookcases and other furniture to be installed at a slant, parallel to the sloping roof.

The club room, also known as the library, was behind the five large arches on the third story. It was accessed by its own elevator from the street. The club room had either green or blue walls and a red carpet. This room also had an Italian fireplace with a painted hood. On one wall was a niche with space for a writing table. The club room also had sofas, tables, lamps, and antique cabinets. A kitchenette and serving pantry, next to the club room, were used when the members hosted events.

The classrooms, dressing rooms, and studios were in the western side of the theater, with the dressing rooms at the front of the building. The dressing rooms were arranged in several tiers because of limited space and because New York City building regulations forbade the construction of dressing facilities below the stage. The main performers typically were assigned dressing rooms nearest the stage, while supporting performers had to ascend several flights of stairs to reach their rooms. One architectural publication wrote that "the number of such flights the actor has to climb to reach his room accurately [indicates] his position in the company, for the higher he ascends the farther he is from stardom."

== History ==
Times Square became the epicenter for large-scale theater productions between 1900 and the Great Depression. The Theatre Guild became a major producer on Broadway during the latter half of this era. The Guild had been founded in 1919 by Lawrence Langner, Philip Moeller, Helen Westley, and Theresa Helburn as an outgrowth of the Washington Square Players. The Guild's first home was the Garrick Theatre on 35th Street, which had 537 seats. The theatre company supported itself through a subscription business model, wherein subscribers could pay in advance for a season's worth of productions. Though it started with 150 subscribers, the Guild had grown to 6,000 subscribers by 1923.

=== Development and early years ===
==== Planning and construction ====
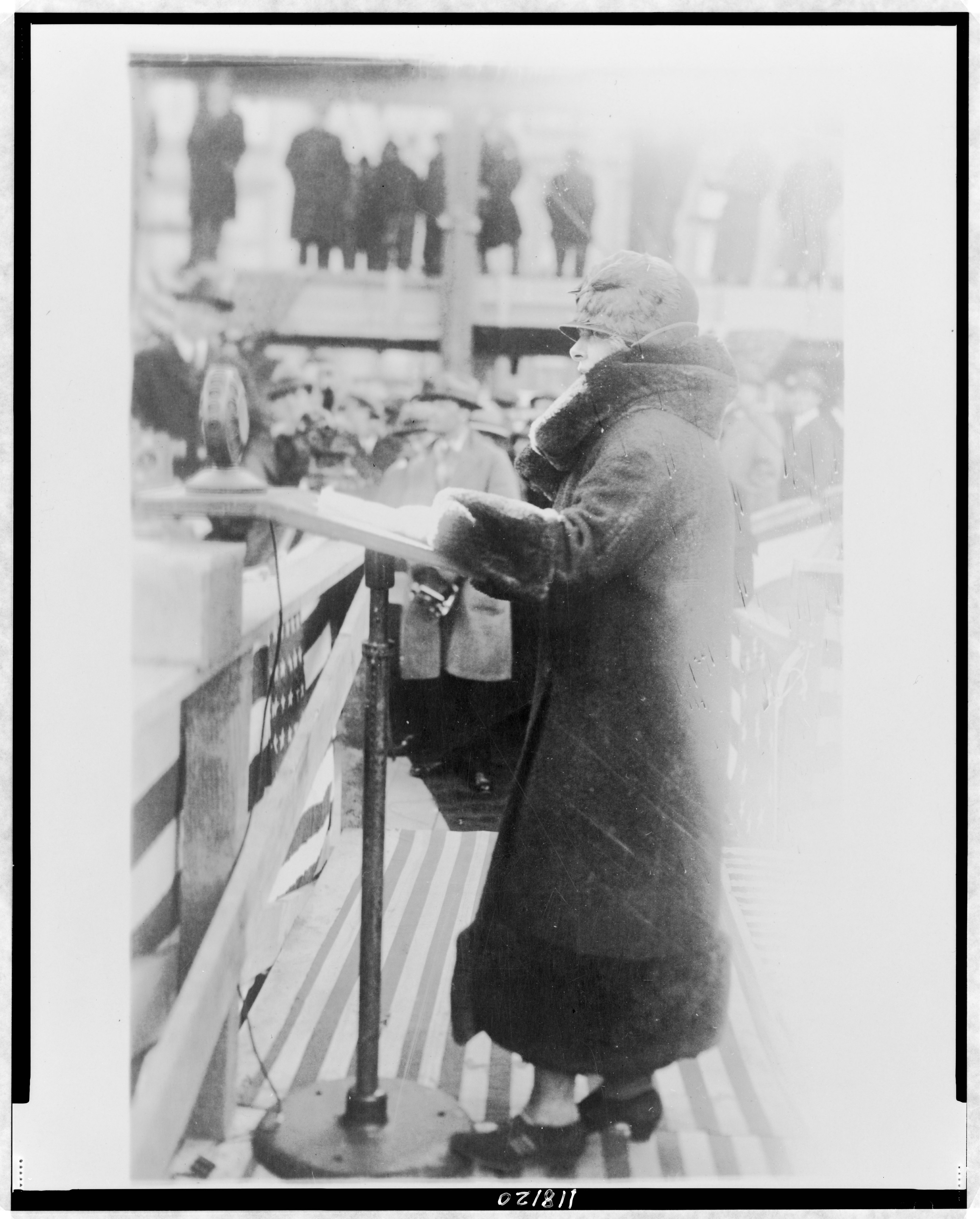
Theresa Helburn at the Guild Theatre's groundbreaking in 1924

At a dinner at the Waldorf–Astoria in March 1923, the Theatre Guild launched a fundraiser for the construction of a dedicated theater, which was estimated to cost $500,000. The proposed theater was to have double the capacity of the Garrick Theatre; a New York Times writer said the Theatre Guild "must be given room for healthy expansion or risk being permanently crippled". The next month, the Guild started selling bonds to pay for the construction cost. The bonds were sold exclusively to Guild subscribers for one week, during which subscribers bought $273,000 worth of bonds. Afterward, the Theatre Guild made the bond issue available to the general public.

Early in the theater's planning, Geddes had proposed a quarter-circular auditorium, with the stage at the middle of the quarter-circle's curve. This arrangement would not have allowed a proper backstage area, so the stage would have been able to descend to the basement. This design was discarded because it did not comply with New York City fire codes. In addition, the Guild's varied membership were unable to agree on a unified design. By February 1924, the theatre company held an option to buy a site on 243–259 West 52nd Street. Plans for the theater were filed with the New York City Department of Buildings two months later at a projected cost of $350,000. Helburn hosted a groundbreaking ceremony for the Guild Theatre on December 2, 1924, with New York governor Al Smith and four hundred theatrical personalities in attendance.

==== 1920s ====
The Guild Theatre opened on April 13, 1925, when U.S. president Calvin Coolidge pressed a button in the White House to turn on the lights. The first production was a revival of George Bernard Shaw's Caesar and Cleopatra, with Lionel Atwill and Helen Hayes, which ran for 128 performances. There was much commentary about the design of the theater. Louis Kalonyme wrote that, "though the Guild Theatre is a refreshing structure, one is not exactly prostrate with admiration before it. One wonders a little, and speculates." Claude Bragdon called the facade "well composed" and "truthful".

Most of the Guild Theatre's productions lasted long enough that the theatre company's 15,000 subscribers had a chance to see each show. A production would typically run several weeks at the theater, relocating to a larger venue if it was favorably received. The Theatre Guild also implemented a program of "alternating repertory" at the Guild Theatre and its other theaters in the 1920s. Actors appeared in multiple plays at the Theatre Guild's venues, switching at regular intervals (often a week). The Guild Theatre largely featured non-Americans' works during the 1920s. In addition to the plays, the Guild Theatre sometimes hosted musical recitals.

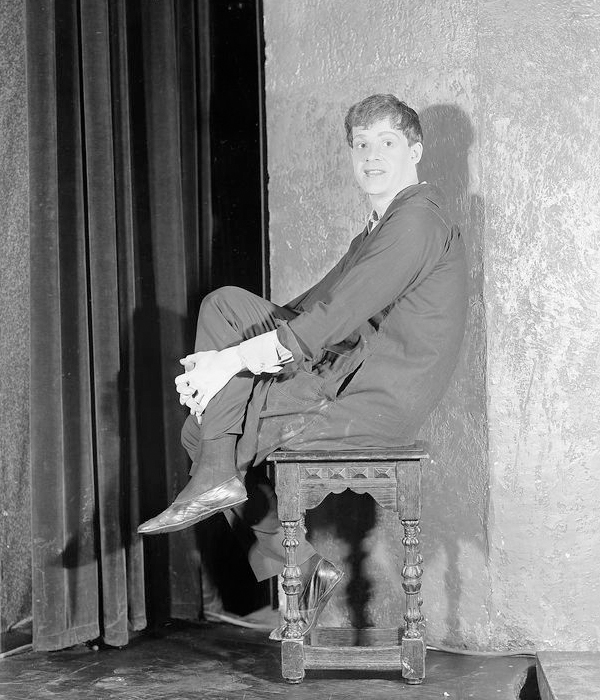
Alfred Lunt in The Doctor's Dilemma

Shaw's play Arms and the Man with Alfred Lunt and Lynn Fontanne opened at the Guild Theatre in September 1925, followed by Ferenc Molnár's play The Glass Slipper. Lunt and Fontanne starred in many of the Guild Theatre's early plays, mostly performing together. The couple's appearances included Goat Song, At Mrs. Beam's, and Juarez and Maximilian in 1926; The Brothers Karamazov, The Second Man, and The Doctor's Dilemma in 1927; Caprice in 1928; and Meteor in 1929. Sometimes, only one spouse appeared, such as Fontanne in Pygmalion (1926) and Lunt in Marco Millions (1928). Other plays during the 1920s included Right You Are if You Think You Are with Edward G. Robinson in 1927, as well as Faust with Helen Chandler, Dudley Digges, and George Gaul in 1928. Alice Brady, Otto Kruger, and Claude Rains performed in Karl and Anna and The Game of Love and Death in 1929, and Gale Sondergaard also appeared in Karl and Anna.

==== 1930s ====
During the Great Depression, the Theatre Guild scaled back its alternating-repertory program. The Guild Theatre's productions during 1930 included Ivan Turgenev's play A Month in the Country with Digges, Alla Nazimova, Henry Travers, and Katharine Hepburn; the revue The Garrick Gaieties; and Maxwell Anderson's play Elizabeth the Queen with Lunt and Fontanne. The next year, the theater hosted Lynn Riggs's play Green Grow the Lilacs (subsequently the inspiration for the musical Oklahoma!) and Eugene O'Neill's play Mourning Becomes Electra. In 1932, the Guild Theatre hosted Shaw's play Too True to Be Good with Beatrice Lillie and Hope Williams; a theatrical version of Pearl S. Buck's novel The Good Earth with Nazimova, Rains, Travers, Sydney Greenstreet, and Jessie Ralph; and S. N. Behrman's comedy Biography with Ina Claire. W. Somerset Maugham's translation of the Italian play The Mask and the Face opened in 1933 with Judith Anderson, Humphrey Bogart, Shirley Booth, and Leo G. Carroll. It was followed that year by O'Neill's comedy Ah, Wilderness! with George M. Cohan and Gene Lockhart.

By the mid-1930s, the Guild Theatre and the neighboring Alvin (now Neil Simon) Theatre were the northernmost venues in the Theater District that still hosted legitimate shows. The Guild Theatre hosted A Sleeping Clergyman and Anderson's play Valley Forge in 1934. The revue Parade opened the next year, along with the play The Taming of the Shrew with Lunt, Fontanne, Greenstreet, and Richard Whorf. Other 1930s plays at the Guild Theatre included Behrman's play End of Summer in 1936 and Ben Hecht's play To Quito and Back in 1937. The interior was renovated and repainted prior to the opening of To Quito and Back. The Theatre Guild was having trouble booking long-lasting productions by the late 1930s. Many successful plays left after 50 performances, with flops having even shorter runs. Other issues concerned the theater's small capacity and the Guild's focus on experimental productions that could not be staged elsewhere.

In 1938, the Theatre Guild started leasing the theater to outside producers. First among them was Gilbert Miller, who opened a production of the J. B. Priestley play I Have Been Here Before in October 1938, which had only 20 performances. The Thornton Wilder play The Merchant of Yonkers opened that December with Jane Cowl, June Walker, and Percy Waram, though this play also closed after a short run. William Saroyan's play My Heart's in the Highlands, his first on Broadway, opened at the Guild Theatre in 1939. Another Saroyan play followed the next year, The Time of Your Life. The United Booking Office leased the Guild Theatre for one year starting in April 1940, sharing the theater's profits and losses. Numerous plays were staged at the Guild Theatre during the early 1940s, none of which were particularly successful. A revival of Ah, Wilderness! and Sophie Treadwell's Hope for a Harvest appeared in 1941, while Papa Is All, Yesterday's Magic; Mr. Sycamore, and The Russian People all appeared in 1942. By then, the Guild Theatre was too small for the Theatre Guild, which was more commonly using the much larger Shubert and St. James theaters.

=== Radio studio and ANTA purchase ===
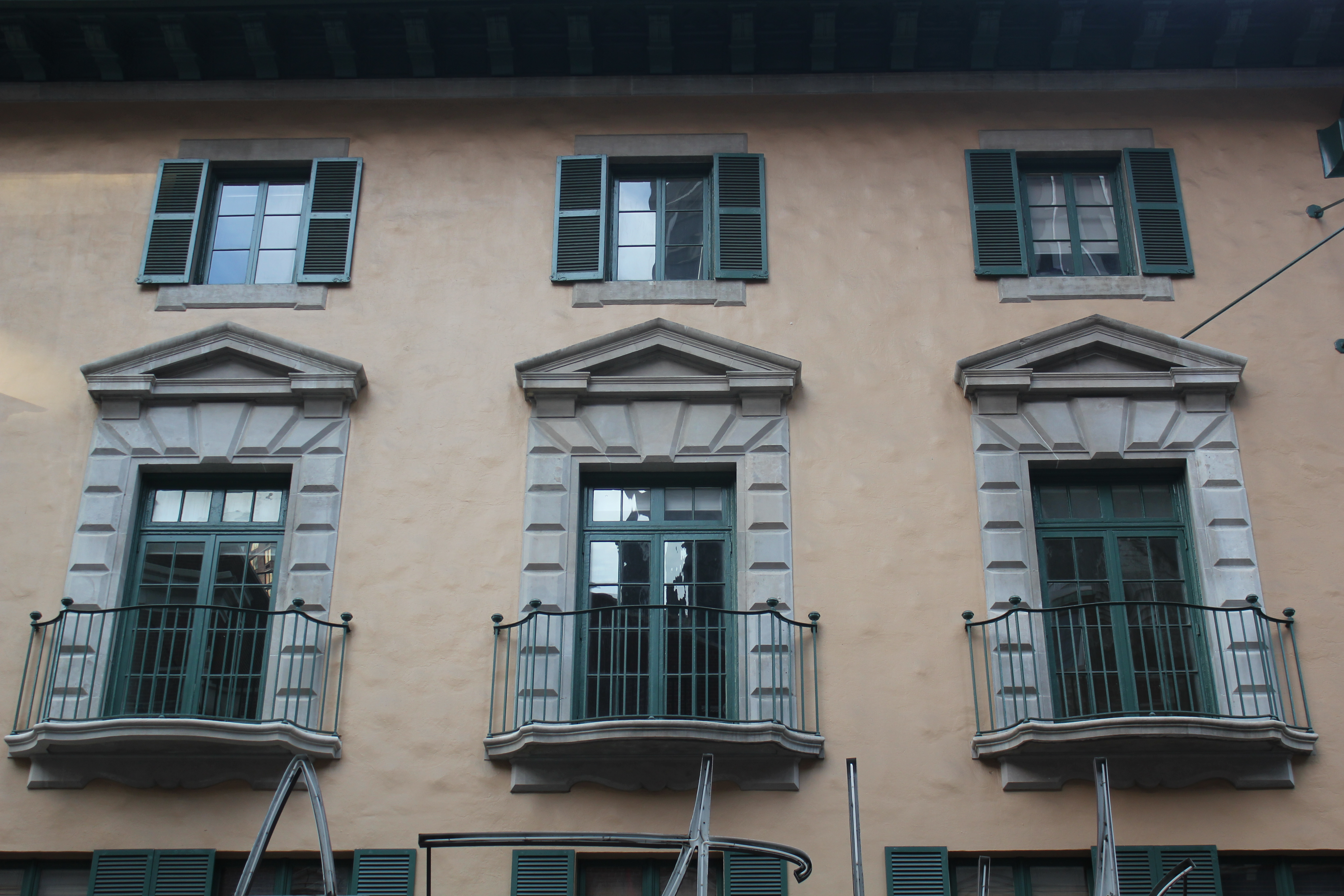
View of loggia

In March 1943, the Theatre Guild leased the auditorium to Mutual Broadcasting System (MBS)'s radio station WOR for three years. WOR relocated from the New Amsterdam Roof, and the Guild Theatre's auditorium was converted into a studio called the WOR Mutual Theatre. The Theatre Guild continued to occupy the offices, dressing rooms, and rehearsal rooms next to the auditorium. Over the next month, MBS added loudspeakers and made acoustic modifications to the theater's interior, which The New York Times said had long suffered from "tonal defects". The Theatre Guild finally relocated its offices from the theater in 1944. The Bowery Savings Bank sold the $557,500 mortgage on the theater in 1946 to the Dorsar Enterprises Inc., which was owned by the Shubert family. The West 52nd Street Theatre Company retained ownership of the theater. Malin Studios subsequently also occupied space in the building, and WOR continued to lease the auditorium on a monthly basis.

By early 1949, the Shubert brothers had expressed interest in taking over the Guild Theatre as part of a reorganization of the West 52nd Street Theatre Company. The proposed sale faced resistance, in part because the Shuberts already operated 98 percent of all legitimate theaters in the United States, but there were no other bidders and federal judge Henry W. Goddard approved the plan that March. The plan was placed on hold pending the outcome of two judicial appeals. Goddard placed the theater for auction in January 1950, and the American National Theater and Academy (ANTA) submitted the highest bid. ANTA had beat out the only other bidder, developer Irving Maidman. The WOR studios moved out that month. The former Guild Theatre was ANTA's first permanent home since the company was founded fifteen years prior. ANTA took title to the theater building that April. Under ANTA ownership, the theater was renamed the ANTA Playhouse and hosted a memorial to actress Jane Cowl in July 1950, before its reopening.

=== ANTA operation ===
==== 1950s ====
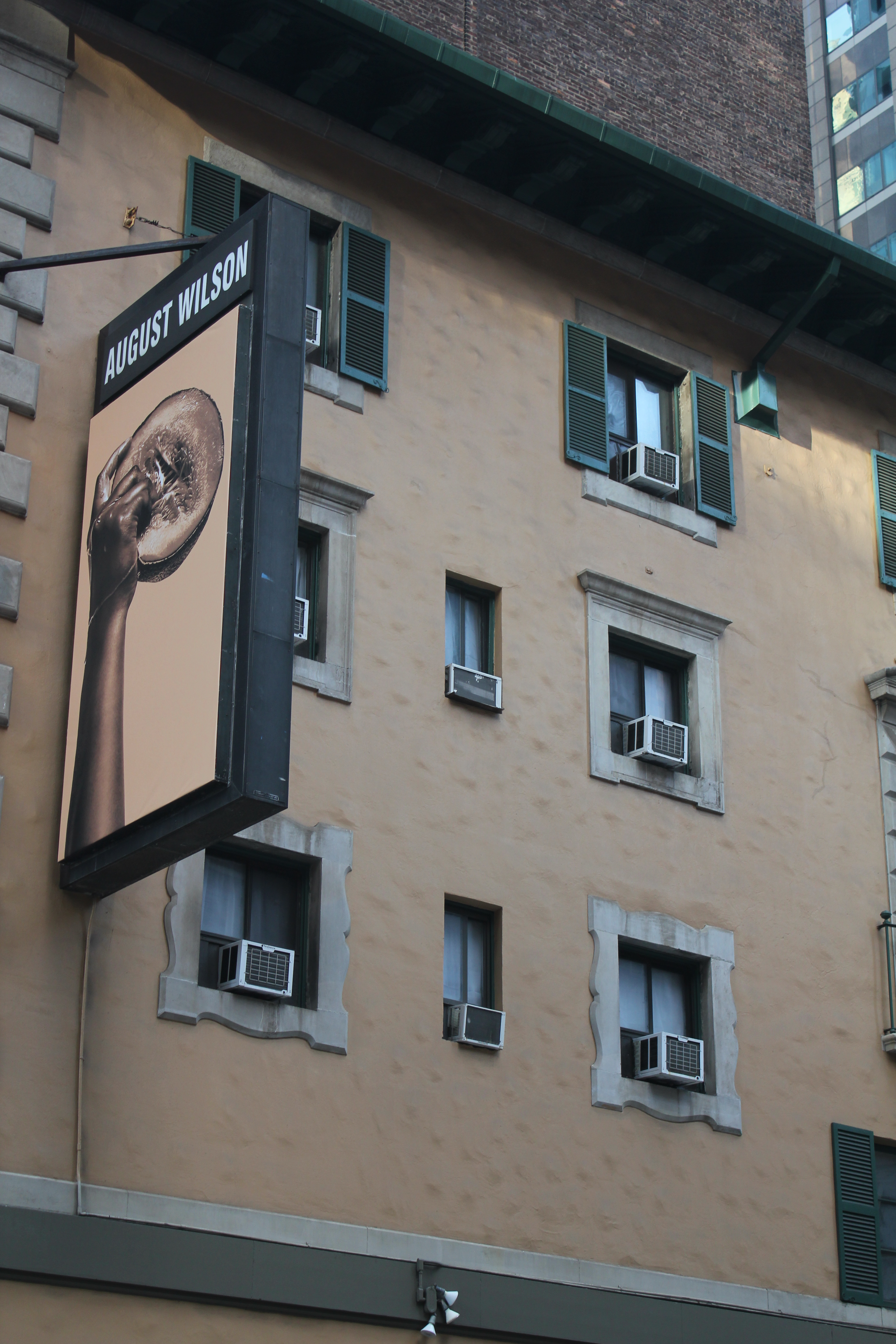
Stage house

ANTA's first play at the theater was Robinson Jeffers's The Tower Beyond Tragedy with Judith Anderson in November 1950. This was followed the next month by a revival of the comedy Twentieth Century with Gloria Swanson and José Ferrer. U.S. president Harry S. Truman dedicated the ANTA Playhouse in April 1951, and the American Academy of Dramatic Arts leased space in the building the same year. Revivals continued for a short time, with productions of Mary Rose and The School for Wives in 1951, as well as Desire Under the Elms and Golden Boy in 1952. The ANTA Playhouse also briefly hosted Mary Chase's play Mrs. McThing in 1952. The ANTA Playhouse was closed for the next two years for a major renovation. The theater's capacity was increased to 1,215 seats, but all of the interior decorations were removed. One publication described the new decorative scheme as "an almost fascist Americana style", enhanced only by blue and gray paint and eagle motifs. The renovations were funded by Robert W. Dowling of the City Investing Company, as well as ANTA treasurer Roger L. Stevens, who held the theater's second mortgage.

The ANTA Theatre was rededicated on December 18, 1954, hosting the William Archibald play Portrait of a Lady. The next year, the theater hosted the play The Dark Is Light Enough, a musical rendition of the play Seventh Heaven, and a revival of The Skin of Our Teeth. Lunt and Fontanne starred in the Russel Crouse and Howard Lindsay comedy The Great Sebastians in early 1956. This was followed by ANTA's first long-running show at its theater, Paddy Chayefsky's play Middle of the Night with Edward G. Robinson, which ran for 477 performances. The ANTA Theatre then hosted two dance engagements in 1957: the Dancers of India and the Dancers of Bali. Two long-running shows followed in 1958. The comedy Say, Darling with Robert Morse, Vivian Blaine, and Johnny Desmond ran for 332 performances, and the play J.B. with Pat Hingle, Raymond Massey, and Christopher Plummer lasted 364 performances. By contrast, Jean Anouilh's The Fighting Cock only had 87 performances in 1959.

==== 1960s to early 1980s ====
James Thurber's revue A Thurber Carnival opened at the ANTA Theatre in 1960. This was followed in 1961 by Hugh Wheeler's play Big Fish, Little Fish, as well as Robert Bolt's play A Man for All Seasons, the latter of which ran 637 performances over the next year. In 1963, the ANTA Theatre hosted The Advocate, the first Broadway production whose run was simultaneously broadcast on Westinghouse Broadcasting. The ANTA Theatre staged two hits in 1964: James Baldwin's play Blues for Mister Charlie and the two-person comedy The Owl and the Pussycat with Diana Sands and Alan Alda. That year, Harris Masterson and Norman Twain leased the theater from ANTA for five years. The ANTA Theatre hosted Peter Shaffer's play The Royal Hunt of the Sun in 1965, which was the last successful production of the decade. Also in 1965, the ANTA Theatre installed an alcoholic bar, being the third Broadway theater to do so after New York state approved liquor sales at theaters.

During the mid-1960s, ANTA operated the ANTA Washington Square Theatre in Greenwich Village as a temporary home for the Lincoln Center Theater. The proceeds from the Washington Square Theatre were used to lower the mortgage on the ANTA Theatre on 52nd Street. The National Repertory Theatre performed at ANTA's 52nd Street theater in 1967, and the American Conservatory Theater performed in 1969. The American Shakespeare Festival's production of Henry V and the Wilder play Our Town also appeared at the ANTA Theatre in 1969. ANTA and the Phoenix Theatre collaborated for the play Harvey with Helen Hayes, James Stewart, and Jesse White, which opened in 1970. Several dance companies performed in 1971, including those of Alvin Ailey, the Dance Theatre of Harlem, Louis Falco, Pearl Lang, Alwin Nikolais, and Paul Taylor. The same year, the hit musical Purlie relocated to the ANTA Theatre from the Broadway Theatre.

The ANTA Theatre's later offerings tended to reflect the decrease in the number of hit productions on Broadway. Still, it hosted some successes such as The Last of Mrs. Lincoln with Julie Harris in 1972. Two years later, Cat on a Hot Tin Roof opened with Elizabeth Ashley, Fred Gwynne, Keir Dullea, and Kate Reid. The musical Bubbling Brown Sugar opened at the ANTA Theatre in 1976, running for 766 performances. In 1979, the theater hosted the Goodspeed Opera Company's production of Whoopee! with Charles Repole, as well as Tom Stoppard's play Night and Day with Maggie Smith. ANTA Theatre hosted the Russian comedy The Suicide with Derek Jacobi in the following year, which had a moderate run of 60 performances. ANTA's last three productions in 1981 were short-lived. Copperfield lasted for 13 performances, and the hit musical Annie stayed at the ANTA Theatre for one month, but Oh, Brother! closed after its third performance. Afterward, ANTA relocated to Washington, D.C.

=== Jujamcyn and ATG operation ===
==== 1980s ====
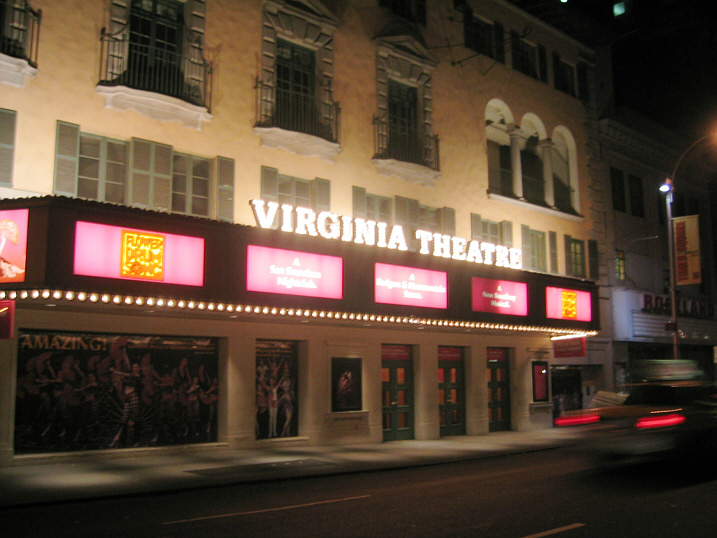
The Virginia Theatre as seen in 2002

James H. Binger and his wife Virginia McKnight Binger of Jujamcyn Theaters acquired the ANTA Theatre in August 1981. At the end of the year, Jujamcyn announced that the theater would be renamed the Virginia Theatre, after Mrs. Binger. The Pilobolus Dance Company was the first act at the renamed theater, performing in December 1981. At the end of the next year, a revival of the play Alice in Wonderland opened, running for less than a month. The Rodgers and Hart musical On Your Toes opened in March 1983, staying for 505 performances.

The New York City Landmarks Preservation Commission (LPC) had started to consider protecting the Virginia as a landmark in 1982, with discussions continuing over the next several years. The LPC designated the facades of the Virginia, Ambassador, and Neil Simon theaters as landmarks in August 1985, (Note: The landmark designation for the Ambassador Theatre's facade was later revoked.) along with the Ambassador's and Neil Simon's interiors, over the objections of the three theaters' owners. The New York City Board of Estimate ratified the landmark designations in December 1985. When more Broadway theaters were being protected as landmarks in the late 1980s, deputy mayor Robert Esnard cited the removal of the Virginia's interior ornamentation as an "extreme example of what happens" when theater interiors were not preserved. The New York Times later said that "there was literally nothing left inside to preserve".

The theater did not open at all between May 1984 and March 1986. The Virginia then hosted Emily Mann's play Execution of Justice in March 1986 and Michael Frayn's play Wild Honey in December. A revival of the operetta The Mikado was performed at the Virginia in 1987, and the attic was renovated the same year. The musical Carrie then opened the following May. Carrie lost about $7 million during its five performances (including $500,000 just on a renovation of the Virginia), and The New York Times called it "the most expensive quick flop in Broadway history". The interior was painted black for Carrie, but the bare color scheme was retained after the musical's closure. Two revivals of hit productions had short runs at the Virginia in 1989: the play Run for Your Wife and the musical Shenandoah. Afterward, Jujamcyn spent another $500,000 to restore the doors, marquee, and other parts of the theater. The Virginia finally had a hit when the musical City of Angels opened in December 1989, running 878 performances over two years.

==== 1990s to mid-2010s ====
The musical Jelly's Last Jam, with Gregory Hines and Tonya Pinkins, opened in April 1992 and ran for over a year. The Virginia Theatre's lobby and second-story restrooms were then renovated in the Art Deco style. A revival of the Lerner and Loewe musical My Fair Lady opened in December 1993, but it shuttered after 165 performances. Subsequently, Jujamcyn hired Campagna & Russo Architects to design a $2.2 million renovation of the theater's interior, except the lobby and restrooms. Since the interior was not protected as a landmark, restoration architect Francesca Russo had greater latitude to redesign the interior. Russo took inspiration not only from the Palazzo Davanzati, which had influenced the original design, but also from other Italian buildings and Atlanta's Fox Theatre. The auditorium's color scheme was changed to a "palette of autumnal colors", as Russo felt the original color scheme was suboptimal with modern lighting. The Virginia reopened in March 1995 with a production of Smokey Joe's Cafe, which had 2,036 performances through 2000.

In early 2000, the Public Theater produced Michael John LaChiusa's musical The Wild Party, one of two musicals performed that season to be inspired by the poem "The Wild Party". (Note: Andrew Lippa's off-Broadway musical of the same name had closed immediately before LaChiusa's musical opened.) It was followed by Gore Vidal's The Best Man during late 2000 and by August Wilson's King Hedley II during mid-2001. Next, in 2002, the theater hosted revivals of the Arthur Miller play The Crucible and the Rodgers and Hammerstein musical Flower Drum Song. Comedian Bill Maher performed a limited run of his solo show Victory Begins at Home in May 2003. The musical Little Shop of Horrors opened that October after almost canceling its Broadway appearance altogether; it lasted for 372 performances through 2004. Subsequently, the musical Little Women ran at the Virginia in early 2005.

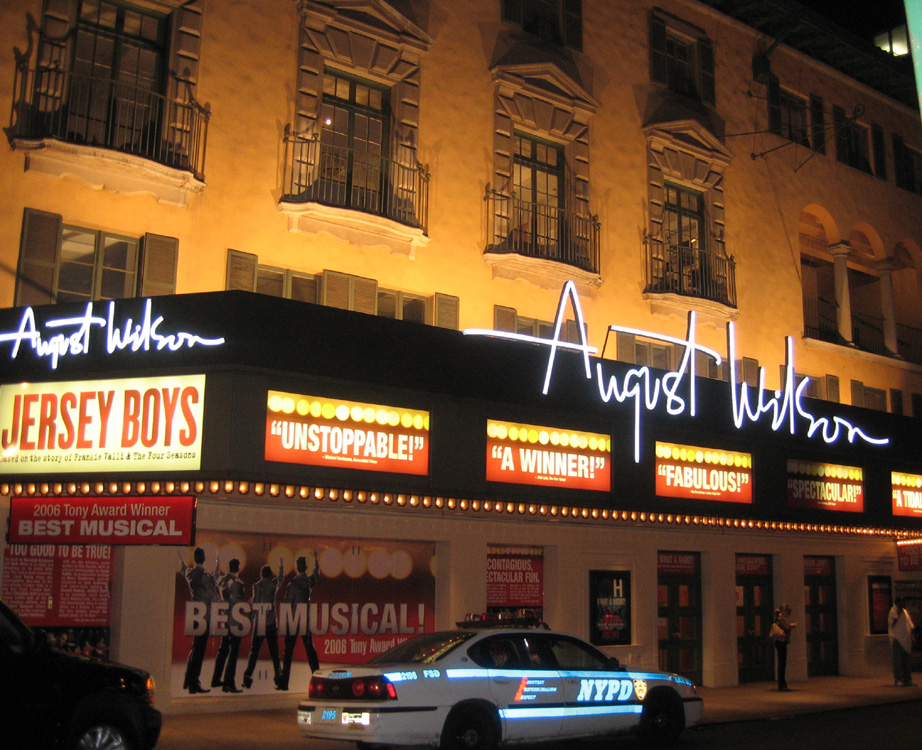
August Wilson Theatre at night

After James Binger died in 2004, Rocco Landesman bought the Virginia and Jujamcyn's four other theaters in 2005, along with the air rights above them. Landesman announced in September 2005 that he would rename the Virginia for August Wilson, the Pulitzer Prize-winning playwright, who had terminal cancer. Wilson died the next month, and the theater was renamed in his honor on October 16, two weeks after his death. Wilson was the first Black theatrical personality to have a Broadway theater named after him. Jordan Roth joined Jujamcyn as a resident producer the same year, and the musical Jersey Boys opened in November 2005. In 2009, Roth acquired a 50 percent stake in Jujamcyn and assumed full operation of the firm when Landesman joined the National Endowments of the Arts. Jujamcyn replaced the theater's seats in January 2012. Jersey Boys occupied the August Wilson for over a decade, running for 4,642 performances before closing in January 2017.

==== Late 2010s to present ====
The musical Groundhog Day opened at the theater in April 2017 and stayed until that September. It was followed at the end of the year by a concert: Home for the Holidays with Candice Glover, Josh Kaufman, Bianca Ryan, Peter and Evynne Hollens, and Danny Aiello. The musical Mean Girls opened at the August Wilson in April 2018. Mean Girls played its final performance on March 11, 2020; the next day, all Broadway theaters temporarily closed due to the COVID-19 pandemic. During the August Wilson's closure, its marquee was typically dimmed to memorialize pandemic victims. The marquee was re-lit in November 2020 to commemorate a longtime Jujamcyn stagehand killed in an accident at the Winter Garden Theatre. Mean Girls was officially canceled in January 2021, while the theater was still closed.

As part of a settlement with the United States Department of Justice in 2021, Jujamcyn agreed to improve disabled access at its five Broadway theaters, including the August Wilson. Also during the COVID-19 shutdown, the Shuberts, Nederlanders, and Jujamcyn had pledged to increase racial and cultural diversity in their theaters, including naming at least one theater for a Black theatrical personality. Jujamcyn was the only theatrical organization that had already named a theater for a Black artist. (Note: In 2022, the Shuberts renamed the Cort Theatre for actor James Earl Jones, while the Nederlanders renamed the Brooks Atkinson Theatre for actress Lena Horne.) The theater reopened on August 4, 2021, with Antoinette Nwandu's play Pass Over, making it the first Broadway house to resume performances during the COVID-19 pandemic. Pass Over had a limited run, closing in October 2021. A limited engagement of Slave Play was then announced, running from November 2021 to January 2022. This was followed in April 2022 by a revival of the musical Funny Girl, which ran until September 2023. Jujamcyn and Ambassador Theatre Group (ATG) agreed to merge in early 2023; the combined company would operate seven Broadway theaters, including the August Wilson. In July 2023, Jordan Roth sold a 93 percent stake in Jujamcyn's five theaters, including the August Wilson Theatre, to ATG and Providence Equity.

The revival of the musical Cabaret opened at the August Wilson in April 2024, and the theater was converted into a theatre in the round in advance of Cabaret's opening. A mezzanine seating area was built within part of the backstage area; new seats were installed around a turntable stage; and the theater was rethemed as the Kit Kat Club, with an entrance in an alleyway. These modifications doubled the theater's usual capacity and were specifically intended to accommodate Cabaret, which ran until September 2025. A stage adaptation of Dog Day Afternoon opened at the theatre in March 2026, running until that June. Paranormal Activity – A New Story Live on Broadway opened at the August Wilson in August 2026 and is scheduled to run until February 2027.

== Notable productions ==
Productions are listed by the year of their first performance.

=== Guild Theatre ===
Notable productions at the theater
Opening year	Name	Refs.
1925	Caesar and Cleopatra	
1925	Arms and the Man	
1926	Little Eyolf	
1926	Juarez and Maximilian	
1926	Pygmalion	
1927	Porgy	
1927	The Doctor's Dilemma	
1928	Marco Millions	
1928	Volpone	
1928	Major Barbara	
1930	A Month in the Country	
1930	The Garrick Gaieties	
1930	Elizabeth the Queen	
1931	Green Grow the Lilacs	
1931	Getting Married	
1931	The Way of the World	
1931	Mourning Becomes Electra	
1932	Too True to Be Good	
1932	The Good Earth	
1932	Biography	
1933	Both Your Houses	
1933	Ah, Wilderness!	
1934	A Sleeping Clergyman	
1934	Valley Forge	
1935	The Simpleton of the Unexpected Isles	
1935	Parade	
1935	The Taming of the Shrew	
1938	I Have Been Here Before	
1938	The Merchant of Yonkers	
1939	Jeremiah	
1939	My Heart's in the Highlands	
1940	The Time of Your Life	
1941	Ah, Wilderness!	
1942	Mr. Sycamore	
1942	The Russian People	

=== ANTA Playhouse/ANTA Theatre ===
Notable productions at the theater
Opening year	Name	Refs.
1950	Twentieth Century	
1951	The House of Bernarda Alba	
1951	Peer Gynt	
1951	Mary Rose	
1951	The School for Wives	
1951	Night Music	
1951	Getting Married	
1952	Desire Under the Elms	
1952	Angna Enters	
1952	Golden Boy	
1952	Mrs. McThing	
1955	The Dark Is Light Enough	
1955	The Skin of Our Teeth	
1955	A Day by the Sea	
1958	Say, Darling	
1958	J.B.	
1959	The Fighting Cock	
1960	A Thurber Carnival	
1961	The Conquering Hero	
1961	Big Fish, Little Fish	
1961	Jerome Robbins' Ballet: U.S.A.	
1961	A Man for All Seasons	
1964	Blues for Mister Charlie	
1964	Traveller Without Luggage	
1964	The Owl and the Pussycat	
1965	The Royal Hunt of the Sun	
1966	Manuela Vargas	
1967	The Imaginary Invalid	
1967	A Touch of the Poet	
1967	Tonight at 8.30	
1967	Song of the Grasshopper	
1967	The Trial of Lee Harvey Oswald	
1967	Spofford	
1968	Maggie Flynn	
1969	A Teaspoon Every Four Hours	
1969	Tiny Alice/A Flea in Her Ear/The Three Sisters (Note: All three plays were performed in repertory.)	
1969	King Henry V	
1969	Our Town	
1969	No Place to Be Somebody	
1970	National Theatre of the Deaf	
1970	Harvey	
1970	The Cherry Orchard	
1970	Othello	
1970	Amahl and the Night Visitors/Help, Help, the Globolinks!	
1971	Purlie	
1972	Different Times	
1972	The Last of Mrs. Lincoln	
1974	Cat on a Hot Tin Roof	
1975	A Letter for Queen Victoria	
1975	Summer Brave	
1976	Bubbling Brown Sugar	
1978	First Monday in October	
1979	Whoopee!	
1979	Night and Day	
1980	The Suicide	
1981	Copperfield	
1981	Annie	

=== Virginia Theatre ===
Notable productions at the theater
Opening year	Name	Refs.
1982	Alice in Wonderland	
1983	On Your Toes	
1986	Execution of Justice	
1986	Wild Honey	
1987	The Mikado	
1988	Carrie	
1989	Run for Your Wife	
1989	Shenandoah	
1989	City of Angels	
1992	Jelly's Last Jam	
1993	My Fair Lady	
1995	Smokey Joe's Cafe	
2000	The Wild Party	
2000	Gore Vidal's The Best Man	
2001	King Hedley II	
2002	The Crucible	
2002	Flower Drum Song	
2003	Bill Maher: Victory Begins At Home	
2003	Little Shop of Horrors	
2005	Little Women	

=== August Wilson Theatre ===
Notable productions at the theater
Opening year	Name	Refs.
2005	Jersey Boys	
2017	Groundhog Day	
2017	Home for the Holidays	
2018	Mean Girls	
2021	Pass Over	
2021	Slave Play	
2022	Funny Girl	
2024	Cabaret at the Kit Kat Club	
2026	Dog Day Afternoon	
2026	Paranormal Activity – A New Story Live on Broadway	

== Box office record ==
Mean Girls achieved the box office record for the August Wilson Theatre, grossing $1,994,386 for the week ending December 30, 2018. This was surpassed by Funny Girl, which grossed $2,005,696 over nine performances for the week ending December 18, 2022. Funny Girl broke its own record two weeks later, grossing $2,405,901 over nine performances running through January 1, 2023.

== See also ==
- List of New York City Designated Landmarks in Manhattan from 14th to 59th Streets
- List of Broadway theaters
