= My Heart's in the Highlands (disambiguation) =

"My Heart's in the Highlands" is a 1789 Scottish song and poem by Robert Burns.

My Heart's in the Highlands may also refer to:

- My Heart's in the Highlands (play), 1939 one-act play by Armenian-American author William Saroyan
- My Heart's in the Highlands (album), 1954 collection of Scottish love songs by American singer Jo Stafford
- My Heart's in the Highlands, November 7, 1960 adaptation of Saroyan's play on The Play of the Week

== See also ==
- My Heart Is in the Highlands, 1975 Armenian drama film based on Saroyan's play
