= Walt Odets =

American clinical psychologist and author (1947–2026)

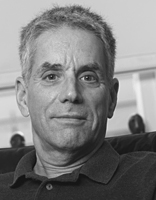
- Born: Walt Whitman Odets; February 4, 1947; Los Angeles, California, U.S.
- Died: July 5, 2026 (aged 79); Berkeley, California, U.S.
- Education: Wesleyan University (BA); Professional School of Psychology (MA, PhD)
- Occupations: Clinical psychologist; writer
- Parent: Clifford Odets (father)
- Website: https://waltodets.com

Walt Whitman Odets (February 4, 1947 – July 5, 2026) was an American clinical psychologist and author. He wrote about the early development, psychological and social experiences of gay men and their communities. Odets's earlier writing focused on the lives of men living in and surviving the early AIDS epidemic. The spring 1996 issue of Positive Impact Journal called him "an important voice in the AIDS education and prevention arena". Odets's 1995 study, In the Shadow of the Epidemic: Being HIV-Negative in the Age of AIDS, was listed by The New York Times as among the "Notable Books of the Year 1995." Additionally, In the Shadow of the Epidemic was the No. 1 bestselling book purchased by gay men in the late fall of 1995, according to The Advocate, and was confirmed as a "Gay Bestseller of 1995" by the Feminist Bookstore News.

Odets's later work focused on the psychological aftermath of the epidemic, the early-life experience of stigmatization and adolescent trauma among young gay men, and the conventional idea of "the homosexual" and its influences on gay identities, self-compromise and relationships between men. In 2019 Farrar, Straus & Giroux published his Out of the Shadows: Reimagining Gay Men's Lives.

== Early life and education ==
Odets was born on February 4, 1947, in Los Angeles, California, to playwright, screenwriter and director Clifford Odets and actress Bette Grayson. The family, which included Walt's sister Nora, two years his senior, moved to New York City in the summer of 1948. Odets and Grayson separated in October 1949 and were divorced in November 1951. In February 1954, Grayson died suddenly of pneumonia, leaving seven-year-old Walt and his disabled sister in the care of their father. In 1955, the truncated family moved back to the West Coast so that Clifford could return to screenwriting in order to make a living. He also considered California a healthier environment in which to raise children.

He attended Beverly Hills High School, during which time he developed a continuing interest in photography. He was eventually awarded the San Francisco Foundation's James D. Phelan Award for Photography in 2007.

Clifford Odets died in Los Angeles in 1963 when Walt was sixteen. After his father's death, Walt frequently stayed in New York with his legal guardians, Lee and Paula Strasberg. The Strasbergs were long-time friends of Clifford, dating from the early years of the Group Theatre, of which Clifford was a founding member. Lee Strasberg acted as interim literary executor of Clifford Odets's estate until Walt Odets was eligible to assume the executorship at the age of 21.

Odets received a B.A. in philosophy from Wesleyan University in 1969.

== AIDS activism ==
Odets trained as a clinical psychologist at San Francisco's Professional School of Psychology from which he received his PhD in 1989. While working as a psychology intern in the San Francisco area in the mid-1980s, Odets noticed a dramatic increase in the number of gay and bisexual men seeking treatment for acute depression, hypochondriasis, anxiety disorders and sexual dysfunction. Many of these men were HIV-negative (seronegative). Seronegative men with these symptoms came to be referred to as the "worried well". Many seronegative men felt alienated from close friends and lovers who had tested positive for the virus. Not suffering from infection itself, they often felt marginalized by the gay community, for whom the AIDS crisis had become the defining issue due to the scope of the crisis.

By the early 1990s, Odets had become a controversial figure in gay communities for criticizing the approach of widely accepted AIDS prevention programs that were proving ineffective. A 1993 study conducted in San Francisco had shown "a sharp rise in the annual rate of HIV infection among gay men under 30, to almost four times the overall rate in 1987". Odets called for a re-evaluation of the prevention programs, suggesting that the approach taken by the programs themselves might be partly responsible for the increase in transmission of the virus.

He stressed that seropositive and seronegative men should be targeted differently in terms of prevention strategies. As late as 1996, the New York Times noted that "the one-note educational strategy of the prevention organizations ha[d] barely changed since 1985. That strategy basically boils down to normative, hand-slapping variations on Just Say No." Odets pinpointed the failure of the prevention groups, arguing that they "had been guilty of ignoring the deepest root of gay men's unsafety: the psychological root, what they feel".

Odets's full-length 1995 study, In the Shadow of the Epidemic: Being HIV-Negative in the Age of AIDS, was hailed for its "concise description of the many manifestations of the psychological epidemic confronting HIV-seronegative individuals ... [including] the defenses of denial and regression that color many responses to AIDS. Depression, mania, anxiety, hypochondriasis, and sexual dysfunctions are frequent manifestations of the psychological epidemic." Odets addressed the psychological epidemic of AIDS "survivor guilt" and the crucial part it was playing in the failure of AIDS prevention campaigns. According to the spring 1996 issue of Positive Impact Journal, "the relatively new focus on HIV-negative people in AIDS prevention programs is something that Walt Odets is largely responsible for".

By September 1996, Odets's views had become so controversial within the San Francisco gay prevention community that "none of the major AIDS organizations there [would] work with him. Instead, he ... consulted on projects for Gay Men's Health Crisis", often referred to by its acronym GMHC, in New York. In 2013 a New York Times article said that over the course of three decades from its founding in 1981, GMHC had been "a leader in the fight against the disease and a model for many other organizations".

Odets continued speaking out in support of issues relating to gay and bisexual men throughout the mid-1990s and was featured on numerous radio programs, mostly in the Bay Area. He was named by OUT magazine as "one of the 100 most impressive, influential and controversial gay men and lesbians of 1996".

== Later life and death ==
Odets continued to live in the Bay Area, where he wrote and maintained a private practice in psychotherapy and couples counseling. He died from Alzheimer's disease in Berkeley, California, on July 5, 2026, at the age of 79.

== Personal life ==
Odets was openly gay. At the time of his death, Armen Davoudian was his companion.

== Selected works ==
- Out of the Shadows: Reimagining Gay Men's Lives. New York: Farrar, Straus and Giroux. 2019. ISBN 978-0-2413-8806-8.
- In the Shadow of the Epidemic: Being HIV-Negative in the Age of AIDS. Durham, North Carolina: Duke University Press. 1995. ISBN 978-0-8223-1638-1.
- "Some Thoughts on Gay Male Relationships and American Society". Journal of the Gay and Lesbian Medical Association. 2 (1). 1998. Archived from the original on April 9, 2017.
- "Risk Appraisal and HIV Prevention". Focus: A Guide to AIDS Research and Counseling. 11 (10). The AIDS Health Project of the University of California, San Francisco. 1996. Archived from the original on April 9, 2017.
- Odets, Walt (May 1995). "The Fatal Mistakes of AIDS Education". Harper's Magazine. Vol. May 1995.
- "Surviving Loss". Out. September 1995.
- "Why We Stopped doing Primary Prevention for Gay Men in 1985". AIDS & Public Policy Journal. 9 (4). 1995. Archived from the original on April 8, 2017.
- "AIDS Education and Harm Reduction for Gay Men: Psychological Approaches for the 21st Century". AIDS & Public Policy Journal. 1 (9). 1994. Archived from the original on April 9, 2017.
- Martin Duberman, ed. (1997). "52: On the Need for a Gay Reconstruction of Public Health". A Queer World: The Center For Lesbian And Gay Studies Reader. New York City: New York University Press. ISBN 978-0814718759.
