= Golden Boy (1939 film) =

1939 film by Rouben Mamoulian

- Original poster
- Directed by: Rouben Mamoulian
- Screenplay by: Lewis Meltzer; Daniel Taradash; Sarah Y. Mason; Victor Heerman
- Based on: Golden Boy by Clifford Odets
- Produced by: William Perlberg
- Starring: Barbara Stanwyck; Adolphe Menjou; William Holden
- Cinematography: Nicholas Musuraca (as Nick Musuraca); Karl Freund
- Edited by: Otto Meyer
- Music by: Victor Young
- Color process: Black and white
- Production company: Columbia Pictures
- Distributed by: Columbia Pictures
- Release date: September 5, 1939
- Running time: 99 minutes
- Country: United States
- Language: English

Golden Boy is a 1939 American drama romance sports film directed by Rouben Mamoulian, and starring Barbara Stanwyck, Adolphe Menjou, and William Holden. It is based on the 1937 play of the same title by Clifford Odets.

== Plot ==
Promising young violinist Joe Bonaparte (William Holden) wants to be a professional prizefighter, “to own things and to give things” that a career in music cannot provide. Joe brings Tom Moody (Adolphe Menjou), an almost bankrupt fight manager, the news that Moody's fighter has just broken his hand. Joe—who was sparring with the man when it happened—wants to take the boxer's place in the impending fight. Lorna Moon (Barbara Stanwyck), Moody's longtime girlfriend, persuades him to take the chance. (Moody wants to marry Lorna, but his wife wants $5,000 to divorce him—The equivalent of $115,733.57 in 2026.)

Joe calls his father to tell him he'll be late tonight. Papa (Lee J. Cobb), wants his son to continue developing his musical talent and has spent $1,500 ( $34,720.07 in 2026.) on a Rugieri violin for Joe's 21st birthday.

Moody, Roxy and Lorna discover why Joe has been holding back in the ring, protecting his hands. Lorna is dispatched to convince him to keep fighting. Joe confides in her: “A prizefight is an insult to a man's soul.” and she is “like music” to him. But he realizes that Moody sent her, they quarrel—and he promises to be the next world champ.

Joe tells his heartbroken father to return the violin and wins fight after fight in a cross country tour that lasts 8 months.

Dangerous Gangster Eddie Fuseli (Joseph Calleia) wants a piece of the action. He and Joe are to meet the next day. Moody tells Lorna to keep Joe away from Fuseli.

Joe takes Lorna home with him. Papa refuses Joe's money; Joe gives it to his brother-in-law to buy a cab. After dinner, the whole family sings. Papa brings out the violin. Joe tries to play Brahms' Cradle Song and runs out. Papa asks Lorna to look after his son.

She tells Joe she has never seen such happy people or been so happy herself. She tells him she was wrong about him: His heart's in music; he has enough money to get his hands right. But Joe wants the crown— and her. She tells him what she owes Moody, but agrees to share Joe's home.

At the office, Moody tells Lorna his wife wants a divorce. She tells him she's leaving him, and he grabs her. Joe walks in and misunderstands. Fuseli walks in, and with one phone call he uses his influence to get Joe a fight in Madison Square Garden.

Lorna declares her love for Moody.

Five weeks later, under Fuseli's influence, the formerly sweet Joe has turned into a hard-hearted boxer. He is about to fight the semi-final match, against Chocolate Drop “Chokky” (James “Cannonball” Green).

Fuseli has bought Moody out. Papa comes the changing room and gives Joe the “word” to fight he has always withheld. It's “too late” for music. Joe weeps while the trainer gives him a massage and a pep talk.

Joe walks out to the ring determined to “show them all”.by winning. He knocks out his opponent in the second round, killing him and breaking his own right hand. Lorna tells Moody that she loves Joe and goes to him. Joe will not be consoled. When he tells Chokky's grieving family his life is worth nothing, Chokky's father tells him that is not true.

Joe quits Fuseli, who slugs him. When he tells Lorna he has nothing to give her. She replies that this is the beginning of a new life. His hand will heal. She takes him home to his father, who embraces both of them.

== Cast ==
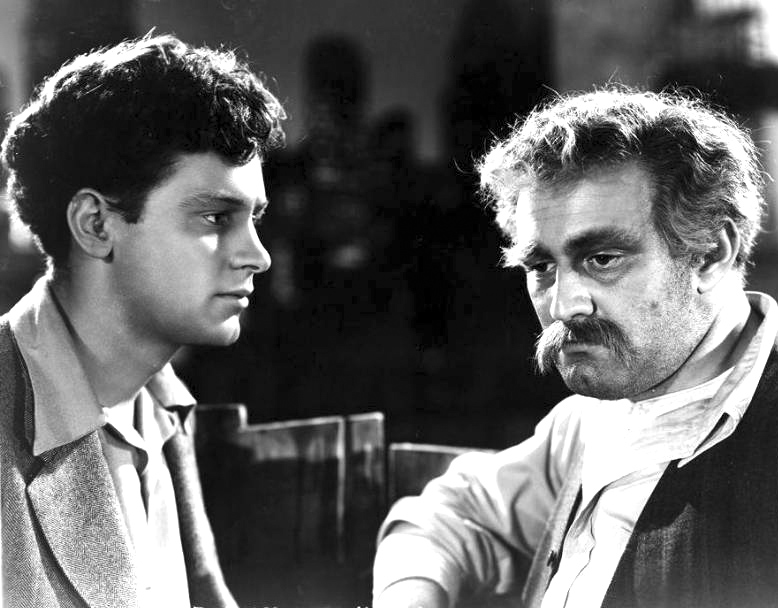
William Holden and Lee J. Cobb in Golden Boy

The cast included:

- Barbara Stanwyck as Lorna Moon
- Adolphe Menjou as Tom Moody
- William Holden as Joe Bonaparte
- Lee J. Cobb as Mr. Bonaparte—“Papa”
- Joseph Calleia as Eddie Fuseli
- Sam Levene as Siggie
- Edward Brophy as Roxy Lewis (credited as Edward S. Brophy)
- Beatrice Blinn as Anna
- William H. Strauss as Mr. Carp
- Don Beddoe as Borneo

James "Cannonball" Green plays Chocolate Drop, Joe's final opponent, in an uncredited role.

== Production ==
In 1938, Columbia purchased the rights to Odets' play for $100,000, intending to produce a film starring Jean Arthur and directed by Frank Capra. Actors considered for the role of Joe Bonaparte included John Garfield, Elia Kazan, Richard Carlson, and Tyrone Power. However, director Rouben Mamoulian expressed interest in Holden after seeing his screen test. Under the terms in which Holden was obtained contractually from Paramount, Columbia paid him $25 a week. Golden Boy was Holden's first starring role and jumpstarted his career.

“The film is memorable in great part because of the luminous performances of Barbara Stanwyck and Mamoulian’s personal discovery, William Holden…Holden credited Stanwyck with having pulled him through his demanding assignment by coaching him in her trailer each evening after the day’s shooting.”—Film historian Marc Spergel in Reinventing Reality: The Art and Life of Rouben Mamoulian (1993).

The producers were initially unhappy with Holden's work and tried to dismiss him, but Stanwyck insisted that he be retained. Thirty-nine years later, when Holden and Stanwyck were joint presenters at the 1978 Academy Awards, he interrupted their reading of a nominee list to thank her publicly for saving his career. She was touched and they embraced. In 1982, Stanwyck returned the favor during her acceptance speech for an Honorary Oscar at the 1982 Academy Award ceremony, saying of Holden, who had died after falling in his home a few months earlier: "I loved him very much, and I miss him. He always wished that I would get an Oscar. And so tonight, my golden boy, you got your wish".

Playwright Clifford Odets was reportedly displeased at the many changes made in the film from his original play, partly due to the Motion Picture Production Code and partly to the rewritten ending. Whereas the play ended with Joe and Lorna deciding to escape their problems and being killed in a car accident, the film closes with Joe and Lorna deciding to return to Joe's home together.

The climactic boxing scene was filmed on location at Madison Square Garden in New York City.

== Reception ==
New York Times film critic Frank Nugent offers conditional praise for Mamoulian's adaption of the Clifford Odets play. According to Nugent, Golden Boy is at its best when it diverges from “stage bound” patterns and applies cinematic methods to convey “the Odets allegory.” The climactic and tragic boxing match, which occurs off-stage in the play, appears in the film as “a savagely eloquent piece of cinematic social comment” showcasing the social milieu that attend these fights: “[T]he mugs, the gamblers, the fashionable set, the race groups, the sadists, the broken-down stumble-bums rolling their heads with the punches...these are the memorable things in the picture, the truly cinematic things.”

Though “scarcely [a] first-rate motion picture,” concedes Nugent, Golden Boy "is the sort of film we can endorse heartily in spite of its shortcomings.”

== Accolades ==
The score by Victor Young was nominated for an Academy Award for Best Original Score.

== Adaptations ==
On January 7, 1940, Stanwyck performed a parody of Golden Boy on The Jack Benny Program.

The 1947 film Body and Soul was partly based on Golden Boy.

== Theme ==
Columbia Picture's screenwriters “stripped (Clifford Odet's stage play) of its left-wing rhetoric” as well as its tragic denouement. Director Mamoulian ignored the larger social issues of “modern capitalist society” and proceeded to reduce the central theme to that of an individual's struggle to “choose between his spiritual or animalistic impulses.”

By entering into a Faustian bargain, concert violinist cum professional boxer Josef “Joe” Bonaparte “loses his soul and wreaks destruction on the lives of others in his quest for self-fulfillment. In the end he is left with almost unendurable guilt.” Mamoulian and Columbia deviated from the Odets theme and tacked on a Hollywood-style happy ending. The picture does not address the “racial issues inherent in the fight” in which the white Bonaparte “Golden Boy” is pitted against the African-American “Chocolate Drop,” who is killed in the homicidal match. Film historian Marc Spergel writes:

Mamoulian has the murdered boxer’s father say “We just little people, and all of us got a burden, even you,” maintaining the screen image of blacks as lovingly accepting their status as morally superior victims, without rancor, and so patronizing blacks under the guise of ennoblement.

Spergal concludes that Golden Boy is an expression of the misanthropic outlook that informs Mamoulian's themes: A cinematic metaphor that defines Hollywood “as a place where artistic sensitivity and appreciation are wasted on people who crave only bread and circuses…”

== See also ==
- List of boxing films
