= Elinor Miller Greenberg =

American educationalist (1932–2021)

Elinor "Ellie" Miller Greenberg
- Born: Elinor Miller; November 13, 1932; Brooklyn, New York
- Died: September 15, 2021 (aged 88); Centennial, Colorado
- Education: University of Northern Colorado; University of Wisconsin-Madison; Mount Holyoke College
- Known for: Adult education
- Spouse: Manny Greenberg
- Children: 3

Elinor "Ellie" Miller Greenberg (November 13, 1932 – September 15, 2021) was an American author educationalist and speech pathologist, an expert in the field of adult education and experiential learning, as well as a former civil rights activist. She saw access to education as a social justice issue, and spent over thirty years creating higher education programs for non-traditional students. She headed the University Without Walls program in the 1970s; created a weekend BSN program for nurses in rural Colorado; established a degree program for Colorado prison inmates and ex-offenders; and established online master's degree programs for nurses in the 1990s. She was inducted into the Colorado Women's Hall of Fame in 2010.

== Personal life and education ==
She was born in Brooklyn, New York, in 1932, and grew up in New Jersey. Her ancestors were Ukrainian Jewish refugees who emigrated to the United States in the early 20th century. She graduated from Mount Holyoke College in 1953 with a Bachelor of Arts degree in Speech and Psychology, and earned a Master of Arts degree in Speech Pathology from the University of Wisconsin-Madison in 1954.

In the mid-1950s, she moved to Littleton, Colorado to take her first professional job as a speech therapist, where she then met and married her late husband, Manny. They had three children and four grandchildren together. Ellie was active in the local community, having co-founded the Littleton Council for Human Relations, which campaigned for fair housing legislation and brought Martin Luther King Jr., to Littleton in 1964. Over the years she continued her studies at the University of Northern Colorado and received her Doctor of Education degree in 1981.

== Career ==
Greenberg began her career in the 1950s as a speech pathologist, diagnosing and treating children and adults with speech problems stemming from brain injury, stroke, and developmental delays. Between 1967 and 1971 she taught at the University of Colorado and Loretto Heights College.

In 1971, Greenberg founded the University Without Walls (UWW) program at Loretto Heights College. As UWW director, she developed specialized educational programs for non-traditional students, including Colorado prison inmates and ex-offenders; at-risk high school students; Native American mental health workers; teachers, police officers, returning adult students, Spanish-speaking students, Elderhostel students, and others. She served as National Coordinator for the consortium of 33 undergraduate UWW institutions from 1977 to 1979.

In the 1980s, she established a weekend BSN program for nurses in rural Colorado which was the first of its kind in the state. She established a prepaid tuition program for 39,000 US West employees in 14 states. At the University of Colorado Health Sciences Center in the 1990s, she established online master's degree programs for physician assistants, nurse practitioners, and nurse midwives in under-served areas of Arizona, Colorado, New Mexico, and Wyoming. She was regional coordinator for the Council for Adult and Experiential Learning, and the founding director of Project Leadership, which provided leadership research and training for the boards of nonprofit organizations.

In addition to developing adult education programs, Greenberg trained other educators to work with non-traditional students. She was a guest faculty member at the Harvard Graduate School of Education in 1982 and lectured at many other institutions. Much of her work drew on the research of William G. Perry, Jr., whose "Perry Scheme" she adapted for use in designing adult education programs.

In 1991 she founded a consulting and publishing firm, EMG and Associates. In 1993 she traveled to Germany and visited the Dachau concentration camp as part of a delegation that was profiled in a television documentary, Journey for Justice.

She served on numerous boards and commissions, including the Colorado Women's Economic Development Council, the Colorado Women's Leadership Coalition, Women's Forum, State Board for Community Colleges and Occupational Education, the Anti-Defamation League, the Colorado Board of Continuing Legal and Judicial Education, the Colorado Judicial Institute, and MESA.

== Honors and awards ==
Greenberg received numerous honors and awards over the years. The following is a partial list.

- Colorado Women's Chamber of Commerce Lifetime Achievement Award, 2014
- Wilma J. Webb Founders Award, 2014
- Induction into the Colorado Women's Hall of Fame, 2010
- Colorado MESA Service Award, 2006, 2007
- Martin Luther King Jr. Distinguished Service Award, Arapahoe Community College, 2003.
- Founding Mother Award, Colorado Women's Leadership Coalition, 1997
- Valuing Women's Work Award - Women's Bureau, U.S. Department of Labor, 1995
- Honorary Doctor of Humane Letters, Professional School of Psychology (CA), 1987
- Honorary Doctor of Letters, Saint Mary-of-the-Woods College (IN), 1983
- Minoru Yasui Community Volunteer Award; Proclamation of Elinor Miller Greenberg Day in Denver by Mayor Wellington Webb, 1991
- Woman of the Decade, Littleton Newspapers, 1970
- Human Relations Award, B'nai B'rith Women, 1968
- Distinguished Service Award, Littleton Education Association, 1968
- Citizen of the Year, Omega Psi Phi fraternity, 1966

== Books ==
Greenberg authored, co-authored, or edited nine books and over 200 papers. Her tenth book was published posthumously.

- Tietjen, Jill; Greenberg, Elinor Miller (2022). Over, Under, Around, and Through: How Hall of Famers Surmount Obstacles. Fulcrum Press. ISBN 9781682753354.
- Greenberg, Elinor Miller; Whitney, Fay Wadsworth (2008). A Time of Our Own: In Celebration of Women Over Sixty. Fulcrum Press. ISBN 9781555916442.
- Greenberg, Elinor Miller; Bergquist, William H.; Klaum, G. Alan (1993). In Our Fifties: Voices of Men and Women Reinventing Their Lives. Jossey-Bass. ISBN 9781555425135.
- Greenberg, Elinor Miller (1993). Journey for Justice: From Colorado to Germany. EMG and Associates.
- Greenberg, Elinor Miller (1991). Weaving: The Fabric of a Woman's Life. EMG and Associates. ISBN 9780962976407.
- Greenberg, Elinor Miller (1989). Enhancing Leadership: Sailing the Seas of Boardsmanship. EMG and Associates.
- Greenberg, Elinor Miller, ed. (1982). New Partnerships: Higher Education and the Non-Profit Sector. San Francisco: Jossey-Bass. ISBN 978-0875898940.
- Greenberg, Elinor Miller; Bergquist, William H.; Gould, Ronald A. (1981). Designing Undergraduate Education. San Francisco: Jossey-Bass. ISBN 9780875895086.
- Greenberg, Elinor Miller (1981). Quality Lifelong Education: New Perspectives on Design and Administration. University of Northern Colorado.
- Greenberg, Elinor Miller; O'Donnell, Kathleen; Bergquist, William H., eds. (1980). Educating Learners of All Ages: New Directions for Higher Education. San Francisco: Jossey-Bass.
