= Golden Boy (musical) =

Musical

- Original Broadway Poster
- Music: Charles Strouse
- Lyrics: Lee Adams
- Book: Clifford Odets; William Gibson
- Basis: Play Golden Boy by Clifford Odets
- Productions: 1964 Broadway; 1968 West End

Golden Boy is a musical in two acts with a book by Clifford Odets and William Gibson, lyrics by Lee Adams, and music by Charles Strouse.

Based on the 1937 play of the same name by Odets, it focuses on Joe Wellington, a young man from Harlem who, despite his family's objections, turns to prizefighting as a means of escaping his ghetto roots and finding fame and fortune. He crosses paths with Mephistopheles-like promoter Eddie Satin and eventually betrays his manager Tom Moody when he becomes romantically involved with Moody's girlfriend Lorna Moon. The musical premiered in 1964.

== Background ==
Producer Hillard Elkins planned the project specifically for Sammy Davis Jr. and lured Odets out of semi-retirement to write the book. The original play centered on Italian American Joe Bonaparte, the son of poverty-stricken immigrants with a disapproving brother who works as a labor organizer. Elkins envisioned an updated version that would reflect the struggles of an ambitious young African American at the onset of the Civil Rights Movement and include socially relevant references to the changing times.

In Odets' original book, Joe was a sensitive would-be surgeon fighting in order to pay his way through college, but careful to protect his hands from serious damage so he could achieve his goal of saving the lives of blacks ignored by white doctors. In an ironic twist, the hands he hoped would heal, killed a man in the ring.

== Productions ==
Following the Detroit tryout, Odets died and Gibson was hired to rework the script. The ideals of the noble plot were abandoned in a revision in which Joe evolved into an angry man who, embittered by the constant prejudice he faces, uses his fists to fight his frustrations. His brother became a worker for CORE, and the subtle romance between Joe and the white Lorna developed into an explicit affair capped by a kiss that shocked audiences already having difficulty adjusting to a heavily urban jazz score and mentions of Malcolm X. This was a far cry from the musical comedies Hello, Dolly! and Funny Girl, both popular holdovers from the previous theatrical season.

The Broadway production, directed by Arthur Penn and choreographed by Donald McKayle, opened on October 20, 1964 at the Majestic Theatre, where it ran for 568 performances and twenty-five previews. In addition to Davis, the cast included Billy Daniels as Eddie Satin, Kenneth Tobey as Tom Moody, Jaime Rogers as Lopez and Paula Wayne as Lorna Moon, with Johnny Brown, Lola Falana, Louis Gossett, Al Kirk, Baayork Lee, and Theresa Merritt in supporting roles. Nat Horne was a featured dancer in the production.

An original cast recording was released by Capitol Records, which had invested $200,000 in the production. One song from the score, "This Is the Life", later became a hit in a cover version recorded by Matt Monro. Art Blakey recorded a jazz version of the score in 1964 and Quincy Jones' Golden Boy (Mercury, 1964) featured three versions of the theme.

Davis reprised his role for the 1968 West End production at the London Palladium, the first book musical ever to play in the theatre.

Porchlight Music Theatre presented Golden Boy as a part of "Porchlight Revisits" in which they stage three forgotten musicals per year. It was in Chicago, Illinois in February 2014. It was directed by Chuck Smith, choreographed by Dina DiCostanzio, and music directed by Austin Cook.

== In other media ==
Necco (New England Confectionery Company) created a short-lived candy bar inspired by Davis and the musical. It was called "Golden Boy".

== Song list ==
Act I

- "Workout" - The Boxers
- "Night Song" - Joe
- "Everything's Great" - Tom & Lorna
- "Gimme Some" - Joe & Terry
- "Stick Around" - Joe
- "Don't Forget 127th Street" - Joe, Ronnie, Company
- "Lorna's Here" - Lorna
- "The Road Tour" - Joe, Lorna, Tom, Roxy, Eddie, Tokio, Company
- "This is the Life" - Eddie, Joe, with Lola and Company

Act II

- "Golden Boy" - Lorna
- "While the City Sleeps" - Eddie
- "Colorful" - Joe
- "I Want to Be with You" - Joe & Lorna
- "Can't You See It?" - Joe
- "No More" - Joe & Company
- "The Fight" - Joe & Lopez

== Awards and nominations ==
=== Original Broadway production ===
Year	Award	Category	Nominee	Result
1965	Tony Award	Best Musical		Nominated
1965	Tony Award	Best Performance by a Leading Actor in a Musical	Sammy Davis Jr.	Nominated
1965	Tony Award	Best Choreography	Donald McKayle	Nominated
1965	Tony Award	Best Producer of a Musical	Hillard Elkins	Nominated
