= Jaime Rogers =

American dancer and choreographer (1940–2024)

- Born: Jaime Juan Rogers; May 13, 1940; New York City, U.S.
- Died: January 4, 2024 (aged 83); Los Angeles, California, U.S.
- Known for: Dance and choreography
- Movement: Modern/contemporary dance
- Spouse: Barbara Dell Alexander (m. 1962) Lee Lund (m. 1972–1981) Debbie Esposito (m. 1982) Ina Haybaeck (m. 1999)

Jaime Juan Rogers (May 13, 1940 – January 4, 2024), pronounced and sometimes credited as Hymie Rogers, was an American dancer, choreographer, and director. Nominated for an Emmy in 1976, and perhaps best known for his work with Sammy Davis Jr. in the Broadway musical Golden Boy, for choreographing the TV series Fame and his part in the film West Side Story, his career spanned the stage, film and television.

== Early life ==
Rogers was born in New York City on May 13, 1940, to Jaime Juan Rogers Santos and Ambrosia “Fari” Clemente Y Torres. His parents were respectively from Juncos County and Rio Piedras, Puerto Rico. They married in Puerto Rico in 1925. His paternal grandparents were Juan Rogel and Esperanza Santos. When his father moved to New York in 1929 he changed Rogel to Rogers on his documentation and was known as Rogers from then on. Rogers' older sister Margareto (1928–), was born in Puerto Rico, while he and his sister Polly (1937–2007) were born in New York. For a time, he and his sister were educated in Puerto Rico. In 1940, Jaime's father was drafted into the military during World War 2. After the war, he and Ambrosia separated, and Jaime Sr. opened a barber shop and remarried, going on to have two sons, Glbert and Hiram, with his new wife Tiana. Rogers' father died in 1969 in The Bronx, and his mother died in 1984.

Rogers began dancing at the age of four, taught by his sister Polly. Together, they were child stars on the Latin variety show Spanish Hour. Rogers trained at the High School of Performing Arts and The Juilliard School. He also trained in karate.

== Career ==
Rogers joined dance companies such as Martha Graham, José Limón, Katherine Dunham, Doris Humphrey, Donald McKayle, Jerome Robbins, and Antony Tudor. In 1960 he formed his own touring dance company.

In 1961, he played Loco, a member of the Sharks gang in the film West Side Story. He appeared on Broadway in Golden Boy, Flower Drum Song, Annie Get Your Gun, Finian's Rainbow, Wildcat, Kicks and Co., We Take the Town with Robert Preston, and Bravo Giovanni. In the musical Golden Boy, he played alongside Sammy Davis Jr. as He-Who-Gets-Killed. The show climaxed in a fight scene between the two, choreographed by Donald McKayle. When Davis later that year hosted the Tonight Show starring Johnny Carson, he invited Rogers on to the show to do a dance piece. Rogers later choreographed the London production of Golden Boy.

At the age of 25, Rogers decided to concentrate his career on choreography. His work as a choreographer and director included over 40 television series and 30 specials across the globe. His producing credits included thirty-three episodes of The Sonny & Cher Comedy Hour, Ben Vereen... Comin' at Ya, and The Emmys. He choreographed the 1968 Elvis Presley Comeback Special. In 1976, Rogers was nominated for an Emmy for his choreography in Mary Tyler Moore’s special Mary’s Incredible Dream. In 1978 he choreographed the film Ringo, starring Ringo Starr. Rogers was a founding director of the Inner City Repertory Dance Company ("ICRDC") along with Donald McKayle and Janet Collins in 1971. During the 1971-72 television season, her served as choreographer on the NBC series The Dean Martin Show and the weekly syndicated series Chevrolet Presents The Golddiggers, both produced by Greg Garrison.

In 1985, he replaced Debbie Allen as choreographer for 48 episodes of the TV series Fame. Rogers choreographed other TV series and films including Breakin', Wholly Moses, Caddyshack, and Americathon. The Los Angeles Times described his style as an "exuberant, modern dance-based combination of geometrically balanced lines, driving rhythms and explosive leaps and turns". Rogers produced numerous Las Vegas acts, working with stars such as Juliet Prowse, Wayne Newton, Rita Moreno, and Joan Rivers. He also produced U.S. and global concert tours for such groups as Sha Na Na, The Jackson Five, The Temptations, and Gladys Knight & the Pips and worked with Liza Minnelli, Barbra Streisand, The Doors, David Copperfield, and The Rolling Stones.

In 2005, Rogers was presented with a Lifetime Achievement award at the Les Horton Dance Award ceremony.

== Personal life and death ==
In 1962, Rogers married dancer Barbara Dell Alexander and their son Jaime Juan Rogers Jr. ("Jimmy") was born the same year. In 1972, he married the dancer and actress Lee Lund (1943–2021). Lee attended Juilliard after Rogers graduated. She had also started her professional career dancing on Broadway and later moved to the West Coast where she married Rogers. In 1974 they had a daughter, Ambere and later divorced in 1981.

Rogers died in Los Angeles on January 4, 2024, at the age of 83. He was survived by his wife, Austrian-born actress and dancer, Ina Haybaeck-Rogers (born 1975).

== Credits ==
=== Theatre ===
- Finian's Rainbow, 1960
- Flower Drum Song, 1960
- Wildcat, 1960
- We Take the Town, 1961
- Kicks and Co., 1961
- Bravo Giovanni, 1962
- Golden Boy, 1964
- Annie Get Your Gun, 1966
- Golden Boy, 1968 West End – producer and choreographer at the London Palladium

=== Film ===
- West Side Story, 1961 movie – Loco
- Breakin' – choreography
- Wholly Moses – choreography
- Caddyshack – choreography
- Americathon – choreography

=== Television ===
- The Dean Martin Show, 1971-72
- Chevrolet Presents The Golddiggers, 1971-72
- The Sonny & Cher Comedy Hour, 1971, 33 episodes
- Ben Vereen... Comin' at Ya, 1975
- Fame, 1985
- Elvis Presley Comeback Special, 1968
- Mary’s Incredible Dream, 1976

=== Concert tours and productions ===
- Sha Na Na
- The Jackson Five
- The Temptations
- The Supremes
- The Fifth Dimension
- The Manhattan Transfer
