= Golden Boy (play) =

1937 drama by Clifford Odets

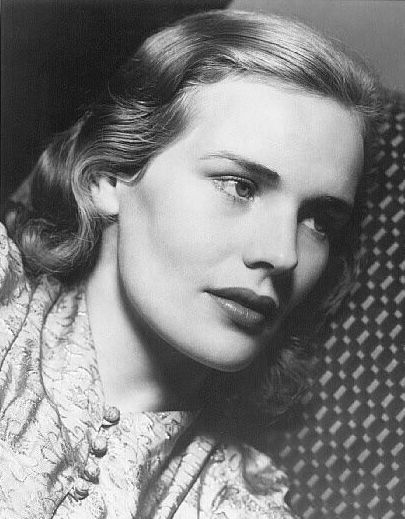
- Publicity shot of Frances Farmer as Lorna Moon from the Golden Boy program, 1938
- Original language: English
- Written by: Clifford Odets
- Characters: Joe Bonaparte; Signor Bonaparte; Lorna Moon; Tom Moody; Eddie Fuseli; Roxy Gottlieb; Tokio; Frank Bonaparte; Anna Bonaparte
- Subject: Boxing
- Genre: Drama
- Setting: New York City

Premiere
- Date: November 4, 1937
- Place: Belasco Theatre, New York

Golden Boy is a drama by Clifford Odets. The play was initially produced on Broadway by The Group Theatre in 1937. Odets' biggest hit was made into a 1939 film of the same name, starring William Holden in his breakthrough role, and also served as the basis for a 1964 musical with Sammy Davis Jr.

== Plot ==
Scene from a 2016 production at the Stella Adler Academy of Acting and Theatre, Los Angeles; Denise O'Callaghan as Lorna

Joe Bonaparte, a young Italian American man and talented violinist, dreams of becoming a professional musician. Joe, however, fights a boxing match for manager Tom Moody, which he wins. Joe's father, Mr. Bonaparte, has scraped up enough money to afford a top-of-the-line violin for Joe's 21st birthday. However, upon learning of Joe's fight from Joe's brother Frank, Mr. Bonaparte decides not to give Joe the violin. Two months later, Joe has become a successful boxer for Moody and Roxy Gottlieb, a prizefight promoter. However, Joe won't throw punches, attempting to protect his hands. Later, Joe prepares to go on a boxing tour, where Mr. Bonaparte presents Joe with the violin. Joe plays it, but tells his father to return it.

Six months later, Joe's career continues to advance. Infamous gangster Eddie Fuseli approaches Moody and Roxy, demanding to be signed on as a partner, which Joe agrees to. Moody, believing Joe to be distracted by his fame, convinces his girlfriend Lorna to talk to Joe. She does so, and the pair profess their love to each other. Despite this, Lorna cannot bring herself to break off her relationship with Moody. Feeling that he has lost Lorna as well as his father's respect, Joe no longer holds back in the ring. In his next match, Joe defeats his opponent, but breaks a hand, thereby ruining any future career he may have had as a violinist.

Six months later, Joe has become a top-ranked prizefighter. He has become disillusioned with his fame and his managers, and has become more vicious in the ring. After learning Lorna is engaged to Moody, Joe confronts her and they argue, where Lorna accuses Joe of being a killer like Fuseli. Disoriented, Joe is unable to stay focused against his opponent, but pulls through with a victory. Before the celebration begins, Joe learns his final blow has killed his opponent. Meanwhile, Joe's managers arrive at the Bonaparte home to wait for Joe and Lorna. Frank receives a call informing him that Joe and Lorna have died in a car accident. Mr. Bonaparte prepares to retrieve the body, saying he will bring Joe "home ... where he belongs."

== Production history ==
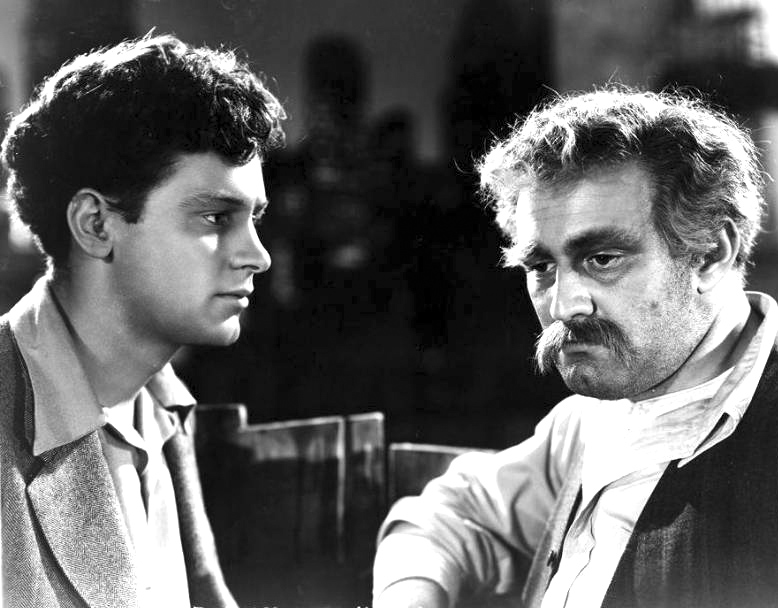
Still from the 1939 film, with William Holden (Joe Bonaparte) and Lee J. Cobb (Mr Bonaparte).

Following his 1935 successes Waiting for Lefty and Awake and Sing!, Odets went to Hollywood to write The General Died at Dawn with the intention of using his salary to support the Group Theatre, the independent theatre company that had produced his earlier plays, despite his previous protests against large corporations, including movie studios. His own internal struggle to choose between art and materialism became the basis for the theme of his play, his first to focus more on psychology and personal relationships than social criticism. The Pittsburgh Post-Gazette reviewer noted that Odets wrote about social consciousness in Waiting for Lefty and "lessons of faith" in Awake and Sing, but in Golden Boy he set out to "merely tell a story."

Odets called the play "symbolic", with one latter-era critic noting that "the show pits spiritual ideals against lust for fame and money in what can only be termed an implausible setup." According to John Lahr, "The heroes of 'Golden Boy' and 'The Big Knife' are both torn between commercial success and artistic fulfillment, driven crazy by their decision to live against their natures; both murder themselves out of nostalgia for their lost integrity."

The original Broadway production, directed by Harold Clurman, opened on November 4, 1937 at the Belasco Theatre, where it ran for 250 performances. The cast included Luther Adler as Joe, Robert Lewis as Roxy, Morris Carnovsky as Joe's father, Roman Bohnen as Tom, and Frances Farmer as Lorna, John Garfield as Siggie, Lee J. Cobb as Mr. Carp, Elia Kazan as Eddie Fuselli and Howard da Silva as Lewis.

The play was revived on Broadway at the ANTA Playhouse, opening on March 12, 1952, and closing on April 6, 1952, after 55 performances. John Garfield played Joe.

A second Broadway revival, produced by the Lincoln Center Theater, opened on December 6, 2012 at the Belasco Theatre. Direction is by Bartlett Sher with Seth Numrich as Joe Bonaparte, Yvonne Strahovski as Lorna Moon, Tony Shalhoub as Mr. Bonaparte and Danny Burstein as Tokio. The play closed on January 20, 2013 after 53 performances and 30 previews. Golden Boy received eight 2013 Tony Award nominations, including Best Revival of a Play and Best Performance By An Actor In A Featured Role In A Play for both Shalhoub and Burstein, and three Drama Desk Award nominations, including Outstanding Revival of a Play.

In 2026, Sam Yates directed a revival, starring Josh O'Connor and featuring Daniel Mays, Hayley Squires et al., which ran between September 8 and October 31, 2026 at the Almeida Theatre in London, UK, and was later made available for cinema viewing by National Theatre Live and later via the National Theatre at Home streaming service.

== Awards and nominations ==
=== 2012 Broadway revival ===
Year	Award	Category	Nominee	Result
2013	Tony Awards	Best Revival of a Play		Nominated
2013	Tony Awards	Best Featured Actor in a Play	Danny Burstein	Nominated
2013	Tony Awards	Best Featured Actor in a Play	Tony Shalhoub	Nominated
2013	Tony Awards	Best Direction of a Play	Bartlett Sher	Nominated
2013	Tony Awards	Best Scenic Design of a Play	Michael Yeargan	Nominated
2013	Tony Awards	Best Costume Design of a Play	Catherine Zuber	Nominated
2013	Tony Awards	Best Lighting Design of a Play	Donald Holder	Nominated
2013	Tony Awards	Best Sound Design of a Play	Peter John Still and Marc Salzberg	Nominated
2013	Drama Desk Award	Outstanding Revival of a Play		Nominated
2013	Drama Desk Award	Outstanding Featured Actor in a Play	Tony Shalhoub	Nominated
2013	Drama Desk Award	Outstanding Set Design	Michael Yeargan	Nominated
2013	Theatre World Award		Yvonne Strahovski	Won
