= Night Music (play) =

1940 play written by Clifford Odets

- Original language: English
- Written by: Clifford Odets
- Setting: New York City

Premiere
- Date: February 22, 1940
- Place: Broadhurst Theatre

Night Music is a 1940 play by Clifford Odets. Written in 1939 and produced by the Group Theatre, the play was a commercial failure, closing after 20 performances.

The play's failure contributed to the dissolution of the Group Theatre. Odets would ultimately spend several months in Hollywood, California in 1940 preparing a screenplay for Night Music, but the screenplay was never produced. It was Odets' last play for the Group Theatre, which was closed in early 1941.

The play, Odets' first attempt at comedy, tells the story of Steve Takis, a young film studio employee who is sent to New York City to collect two trained monkeys and bring them back to Hollywood. One of the monkeys discards his wallet and identity papers, causing havoc, and Takis winds up in jail. He is befriended by a policeman, Detective Rosenberger, and falls in love with a young actress, Fay Tucker. In her 1990 book on the Group Theatre, Real Life Drama, author Wendy Smith called the plot premise "absurd" and described it as a serious flaw, along with the portrayal of Takis as hostile and arrogant.

At the time of the production of Night Music, Group members were yearning for a commercial success that would keep the group alive, and were pinning their hopes on Odets. Harold Clurman cast Group members Elia Kazan as Steve Takis and Morris Carnovsky as Detective Rosenberger. Jane Wyatt, a stage actress but not a Group member, was cast as Fay Tucker. Other roles were played by Group Theater regulars, including Roman Bohnen, Sanford Meisner, Philip Loeb and Art Smith. Richard Conte, then using the name Nicholas Conte, appeared in a small role.

== Critical response ==
The New York Daily News praised the performances called the play "an oddly fascinating bit of urban realism", but the reviews in Boston and New York were generally scathing.

New York Herald Tribune critic Richard Watts Jr. said that the play seemed to show the influence of William Saroyan, which gave it a "curious note of the derivative" that was atypical of Odets, who was noted for its originality. Watts praised the characterizations but said "inevitably you go away from it with a sense of dissatisfaction." He called it "rambling and repetitious and fuzzy in its philosophy and without cumulative value." New York Times drama critic Brooks Atkinson wrote "Now that Odets writes like Saroyan, Doomsday is near." Atkinson praised the performance and called Kazan "one of the most exciting actors in America." But he described the writing as self-indulgent and called Night Music "a foolish play by a man of great talent."

Odets was shaken by the poor notices. In his journal, published in 1988 as The Time is Ripe, Odets called it "Murder in the first degree. The murder of talent, of aspiration, of sincerity, the brutal imperception and indifference to one of the few projects that promise to keep the theater alive." Odets wrote that "something will have to be done about these 'critics,' these lean, dry men who know little or nothing about the theater despite their praise of the actors and production."

== Revival ==
The play was revived in 1951 by the ANTA Playhouse. The cast included Rod Steiger in an early stage role.
