= The Story on Page One =

The Story On Page One
- Directed by: Clifford Odets
- Written by: Clifford Odets
- Produced by: Jerry Wald
- Starring: Rita Hayworth; Anthony Franciosa
- Cinematography: James Wong Howe
- Edited by: Hugh S. Fowler
- Music by: Elmer Bernstein
- Distributed by: 20th Century-Fox
- Release dates: December 1959 (premiere): January 13, 1960 (New York City)
- Running time: 123 minutes
- Country: United States
- Language: English
- Budget: $1,748,000

The Story on Page One is a 1959 American drama film written and directed by Clifford Odets, and starring Rita Hayworth, Anthony Franciosa, and Gig Young. Shot in CinemaScope, the film was distributed by 20th Century-Fox.

== Plot ==
As the film begins, young Los Angeles lawyer Victor Santini (Franciosa) is hired to defend Josephine "Jo" Morris (Hayworth), who is accused of conspiring with Larry Ellis (Young) to murder her husband Mike Morris (Ryder), a police detective. In flashbacks, it is shown that her marriage to Morris is loveless and dull. She met Ellis a widower, with whom she finds companionship and comfort. The two see each other regularly, and are intimate once. Larry's mother (Dunnock), a righteous, controlling mother, finds out about their relationship. She threatens to expose Jo to her husband unless it stops. Jo tells Larry what had happened, and Larry travels to see her and comfort her.

Believing her husband is asleep, Jo lets Larry into her kitchen to talk. However, Mike discovers them, and pulls out his service revolver and struggles with Larry. It ends with Mike being shot dead. Both are charged with first-degree murder (which at the time carried the death penalty), and a large part of the film consists of their trial.

At the trial, prosecuting attorney Phil Stanley (Meisner) stresses how Jo first told police that a prowler had killed her husband, until a cuff link belonging to Larry was discovered at the scene of the crime. He also notes that an insurance policy was purchased a week before the shooting.

Santini, a Harvard Law School graduate, skillfully erodes the prosecution's case, and includes a devastating cross-examination of Larry's mother. Both defendants are found not guilty and leave the courtroom together, after being individually counseled by the presiding judge in his chambers.

== Cast ==
Actor	Role
Rita Hayworth	Josephine Brown Morris
Anthony Franciosa	Victor Santini
Gig Young	Larry Ellis
Mildred Dunnock	Mrs. Ellis
Hugh Griffith	Judge Edgar Neilsen
Sanford Meisner	Phil Stanley
Robert Burton	District Attorney Nordeau
Alfred Ryder	Lt. Mike Morris
Raymond Greenleaf	Judge Carey
Katherine Squire	Mrs. Hattie Brown
Myrna Fahey	Alice
Leo Penn	Morrie Goetz
Sheridan Comerate	Officer Francis Morris

== Production ==
The Story On Page One is the second and last film directed by playwright Clifford Odets, coming fifteen years after his first one, the 1944 Cary Grant drama, None But the Lonely Heart.

Film historian Gene Ringgold quotes Odets, at the time of film's opening in 1959: "I started The Story on Page One as an eight-scene play, twelve years ago. The title for it was The Murder Story. I'd go back to it between other jobs. I'd talk about it. I told Jerry Wald and Bill Goetz about it. Then one night Wald said to me, 'How would you like to write and direct your own Murder Story as a movie?' To be able to direct a movie was the fat bait. The most interesting and stimulating job in movies is to direct. This way the story is not out of my hands."

The film also marks the first of only three big-screen appearances by the noted acting teacher Sanford Meisner, who plays one of the prosecuting attorneys.

== See also ==
- List of American films of 1960
- List of American films of 1959
