= New York Jazz Museum =

Museum in New York City (1972–1977)

Coordinates: 40.764079°N 73.983129°W

The New York Jazz Museum was, from June 16, 1972, to 1977, a center for the study of jazz. At its height it held 25,000 items. It was founded by Howard E. Fischer, among others, but closed after five years amid a power struggle between Fischer and other curators.

== History ==
It was situated in a two-story building in midtown Manhattan and had a small staff, an archive that eventually numbered about 25,000 items and extensive programs in New York City and beyond. Some of the programs won awards and most of them were received with widespread acclaim in the media and from jazz fans. There were the free Calvert Extra Sunday Concerts – 40 per year, sponsored by Calvert Distillers, the Jazz Puppet Show, the Jazz Film Festivals, the Jazz Panorama – an audio visual history of jazz (sponsored by the New York State Council on the Arts), The Jazz Store, Information Center, the exhibits – Louis Armstrong, Duke Ellington, Benny Goodman, Bird & Diz: The Bebop Era, The Sax Section, Count Basie and His Bands, Billie Holiday Remembered, "About John Coltrane," and the Jazz Trumpet. Posters and booklets – including The Jazz Story – were produced in conjunction with the exhibits and there was so much more. An extended power struggle ensued that eventually caused the museum's demise. Entangled in the fatal conflagration was the "Jazz Fraternity", which included the most prominent names in jazz – musicians, producers, writers, artists, et al.

The museum opened on June 16, 1972, in a 1 1/2-story carriage house at 125 West 55th Street, between Sixth and Seventh Avenues, in Midtown Manhattan – two blocks south of Carnegie Hall. After moving to the Empire Hotel and a storage facility in an office building on Broadway and 58th Street, in 1976 the museum purchased a two-story building at 236 West 54th Street in Midtown for $210,000 with help from a Ford Foundation grant. It re-opened in June of that year, but only lasted about a year later after Fischer was dismissed. Most of the archive remains in the Schomburg Center (part of the New York Public Library) and the Rutgers Institute of Jazz Studies in New Jersey.

== See also ==
- 125 West 55th Street
- List of music museums
