= The Russian People =

1942 play

- Original language: English
- Written by: Clifford Odets; Konstantin Simonov
- Genre: Drama

Premiere
- Date: 1942

The Russian People is a 1942 play by Clifford Odets adapted from a Russian original by Konstantin Simonov. The play opened December 29, 1942.
