= My Heart Is in the Highlands =

- Directed by: Levon Grigoryan
- Written by: Perch Zeytuntsyan; Bagrat Hovhannisyan
- Based on: My Heart's in the Highlands (1939) and The Summer of the Beautiful White Horse (1940) by William Saroyan
- Starring: Gor Sahakyan; Sos Sargsyan; Arus Asryan
- Cinematography: Sergey Israelyan
- Music by: Arno Babajanian
- Production company: Armenfilm
- Release date: April 22, 1976 (Soviet Union)
- Running time: 70 min
- Country: Soviet Union
- Languages: Armenian; Russian

My Heart Is in the Highlands (Armenian: Իմ սիրտը լեռներում է, romanized: Im sirty lerrnerum e) is a 1975 Armenian drama film based on William Saroyan's play of the same name. The film was released on 22 April 1976 in the USSR. The film was directed by Levon Grigoryan, starring Gor Sahakyan, Sos Sargsyan, and Arus Asryan.

== Cast ==
- Gor Sahakyan
- Sos Sargsyan
- Arus Asryan
- Nikolai Gritsenko
- Innokentiy Smoktunovskiy
- Azat Sherents
- Aleksandr Atchemyan
- Tsolak Vartazaryan
- Laura Vartanyan
- Anait Topchyan
- Ruben Martirosyan
- Y. Nersisyan
- R. Abovyan
- Migran Kechoglyan
- Ashot Nersesyan
