= Clifford Odets =

American writer and actor (1906–1963)

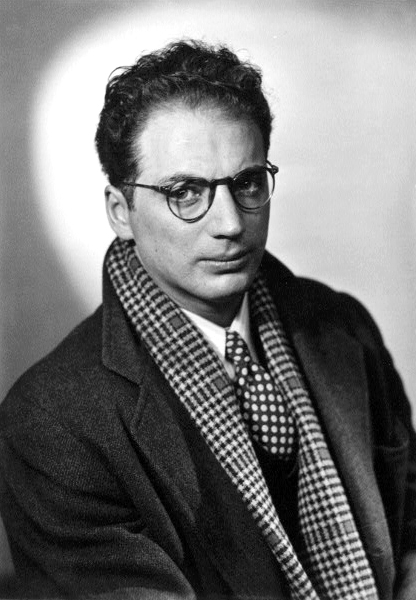
- Odets in 1938
- Born: July 18, 1906; Philadelphia, Pennsylvania, U.S.
- Died: August 14, 1963 (aged 57); Los Angeles, California, U.S.
- Resting place: Forest Lawn Memorial Park, Glendale
- Occupations: Playwright; screenwriter; actor
- Years active: 1925–1963
- Spouses: Luise Rainer (m. 1937; div. 1940) Bette Grayson (m. 1943; div. 1952)
- Children: 2, including Walt

Clifford Odets (July 18, 1906 – August 14, 1963) was an American playwright, screenwriter, and actor. In the mid-1930s, he was widely seen as the potential successor to Nobel Prize–winning playwright Eugene O'Neill, as O'Neill began to withdraw from Broadway's commercial pressures and increasing critical backlash. From January 1935, Odets's socially relevant dramas were extremely influential, particularly for the remainder of the Great Depression. His works inspired the next several generations of playwrights, including Arthur Miller, Paddy Chayefsky, Neil Simon, and David Mamet. After the production of his play Clash by Night in the 1941–42 season, Odets focused his energies primarily on film projects, remaining in Hollywood until mid-1948. He returned to New York for five and a half years, during which time he produced three more Broadway plays, only one of which was a success. His prominence was eventually eclipsed by Miller, Tennessee Williams, and, in the early- to mid-1950s, William Inge.

== Life and career ==
=== Early years ===
Odets was born in Philadelphia to Louis J. Odets (born Leib Gorodetsky) and Pearl Geisinger, Russian- and Romanian-Jewish immigrants, and was raised in Philadelphia and the Bronx, New York. He dropped out of high school after two years to become an actor and a writer.

=== Theater ===
Odets pursued acting with great passion and ingenuity. At the age of 19, he struck out on his own, billing himself as "The Rover Reciter". Under this moniker, he participated in talent contests and procured bookings as a radio elocutionist. He appeared in several plays with Harry Kemp's Poet's Theatre on the Lower East Side. Odets was among America's first real disc jockeys at about this time, at radio station WBNY and others in Manhattan, where he would play records and ad lib commentary. He also functioned as a drama critic, allowing him free entry to Broadway and downtown shows. In this capacity, he saw the 1926 Broadway production of Seán O'Casey's Juno and the Paycock. O'Casey's work proved to be a powerful influence on Odets.

In the early 1920s, Odets spent four summers as a dramatics counselor at Jewish camps in the Catskills and the Poconos. He toured extensively with stock companies, in particular Philadelphia's popular Mae Desmond Company, playing a large variety of character roles at their theater in Chester, Pennsylvania. His first Broadway break came in 1929 when he was cast in two small roles and as understudy to the young Spencer Tracy in Conflict by Warren F. Lawrence. Odets landed his first job with the prestigious Theatre Guild in the fall of 1929 as an extra. He acted in small roles in a number of Theatre Guild productions between 1929 and 1931. It was at the Guild that he befriended the casting director Cheryl Crawford. Crawford suggested that Harold Clurman, then a play reader for the Guild, invite Odets to a meeting to discuss new theater concepts they were developing with Lee Strasberg. Though initially bewildered by the concept of acting as an art, Odets was nonetheless mesmerized by Clurman's talks and became the last actor chosen for the Group Theatre's first summer of rehearsals in June 1931 at Brookfield Center in Connecticut, thus becoming a founding member of the company.

The Group Theatre proved to be one of the most influential companies in the history of the American stage. It was the first to base its work on an acting technique new to the United States, devised by the Russian actor and director Constantin Stanislavski. It was further developed by Group Theatre director Lee Strasberg and became known as The Method or Method Acting.

From the start, Odets was relegated to small roles and understudying his Group colleagues. He understudied lead actor Luther Adler in the Group's production of John Howard Lawson's Success Story during the 1932–33 season. Much to Odets's frustration, Adler never missed a performance, but he gained much knowledge of the playwriting craft by standing in the wings and listening to the play. Odets credited Lawson with giving him an understanding of the potential theatrical power of colloquial language. With time on his hands and at Clurman's urging he began to try his own hand at writing plays.

Odets's earliest plays were an autobiographical piece, 910 Eden Street, and one about his hero, Beethoven, with the working title Victory. Clurman dismissed both as juvenilia but encouraged Odets to continue writing, while steering him toward familiar milieus. In late 1932, Odets began writing a play about a middle-class Jewish family in the Bronx, initially called I Got the Blues. He worked diligently on this play, sharing drafts of it with Clurman and promising parts to his fellow actors—often the same parts. While at Green Mansions, its 1933 summer rehearsal venue in Warrensburg, New York, the Group performed Act II of the play, soon to be retitled Awake and Sing!, for other camp residents. The audience was enthusiastic but the Group's leadership, Strasberg in particular, still opposed producing it.

Until his debut as a playwright, Odets continued to train as an actor with the Group at its various summer rehearsal headquarters in the Connecticut countryside and upstate New York. In addition to Brookfield Center and Green Mansions, these venues included Dover Furnace in Dutchess County (1932) and a large house in the Catskill village of Ellenville (1934). The Group spent the summer of 1936 at Pine Brook Country Club in Fairfield County, Connecticut. Its final summer retreat was at Lake Grove, in Smithtown, New York, in 1939. Odets's exposure to Strasberg's philosophy was essential to his development as a playwright. He said in an interview late in life, "My chief influence as a playwright was the Group Theatre acting company, and being a member of that company ... And you can see the Group Theatre acting technique crept right into the plays."

Odets became the first produced Method-trained playwright with his first publicly presented play, the one-act Waiting for Lefty, on January 6, 1935, at the former Civic Repertory Theatre on Fourteenth Street in New York City. The occasion was a benefit performance for New Theatre Magazine. Like Lawson, a member of the Communist Party, Odets was by this time influenced by Marxism and his plays became increasingly political. Waiting for Lefty was inspired by the 1934 New York City taxi strike and is written in the format of a minstrel show with interconnected scenes depicting social and economic dilemmas of workers in various fields. The focus alternates between a union meeting of taxi drivers and vignettes from the workers' fraught lives. A young medical intern falls victim to anti-Semitism; a laboratory assistant's job is threatened if he refuses to spy on a colleague; couples are thwarted in marriage and torn apart by the hopelessness of economic conditions caused by the Depression. The climax is a defiant call for the taxi drivers' union to strike, which brought the entire opening night audience to its feet with tumultuous applause. The play does not require a proscenium stage and can be performed in any acting space, including union meeting halls and on the street. Waiting for Lefty's unexpectedly wild success brought Odets international fame, though its strong pro-union bent caused it to be banned in many U.S. towns and cities. It was produced by a number of left-wing theaters in Britain, Australia, and other English-speaking countries, and has been widely translated.

Awake and Sing! was written in 1933 and finally produced by the Group Theatre in February 1935 after the success of Waiting for Lefty. This first of Odets's full-length plays is generally regarded as his masterpiece and has been cited as "the earliest quintessential Jewish play outside the Yiddish theatre." The play concerns the Berger family, who struggle to maintain some respectability and self-esteem in the Longwood section of the Bronx while grappling with the stresses of economic collapse. Odets's choice to open the play in medias res, his heightened dialogue style, its blatant bias towards the working class, and the fact that it was the first play on Broadway to focus entirely on a Jewish family distinguish Awake and Sing! from other full-length plays produced on Broadway during this time.

Odets became the Group's signature playwright with the debuts of Waiting for Lefty and Awake and Sing! and his reputation is inextricably connected with the Group Theatre.

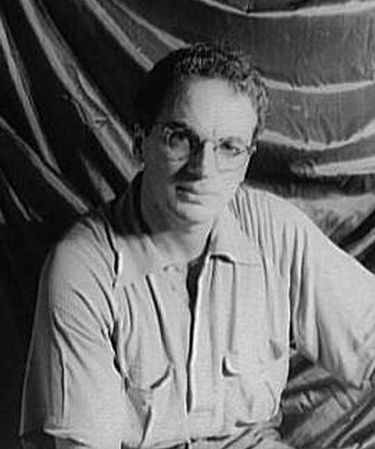
Photo by Carl Van Vechten, 1937

The two 1935 one-acts Waiting for Lefty and the anti-Nazi Till the Day I Die, along with a number of other works by various playwrights produced by the Group Theatre, are harsh criticisms of profiteers and exploitative economic systems during the Great Depression. They have been dismissed by some critics as left-wing propaganda. But Waiting for Lefty is considered iconic in the agitprop genre, is widely translated and anthologized, and continues to be popular. Odets asserted that all of his plays deal with the human spirit persevering in the face of any opponent, whether or not the characters are depicted as struggling with the capitalist system. The highly successful Golden Boy (1937) portrays a young man torn between artistic and material fulfillment. Ironically, it was the Group Theatre's biggest commercial success. From Golden Boy on, Odets's work focused more on the dynamics of interpersonal relationships as affected by the moral dilemmas of individual characters. In 1938 the Group presented Rocket to the Moon, a psychological play that explores the failure of human beings to fulfill their creative potential. Leftist critics rebuked Odets for abandoning his formerly overt political stance and the play was only modestly successful. The playwright George S. Kaufman and others asked, "Odets, where is thy sting?" Nonetheless, Rocket to the Moon garnered enough attention to place Odets on the cover of Time in December 1938.

Rocket to the Moon was followed by Night Music (1940) and Clash by Night (1941), neither of which was successful. Except for his adaptation of Konstantin Simonov's play The Russian People in the 1942–43 season, Odets did not have another Broadway production until 1949. The Big Knife is an allegory about the damaging effects of fame and money on the character of the artist; it also alludes indirectly to the politics of the early Cold War period. The play's harsh critique of Hollywood mores was interpreted as ingratitude on the part of Odets, who had by this time made a significant amount of money writing films. It ran only three months and lost money at the box office.

Odets's 1950 play The Country Girl focuses on the effects of alcohol abuse on creativity and marital relations. It was a critical and box-office success and later adapted for a film starring Bing Crosby and Grace Kelly. Both actors earned Academy Award nominations for their performances. Kelly won Best Actress for her work in the film, and screenwriter George Seaton received an Oscar for his adaptation. Odets's last play was produced on Broadway in 1954. The Flowering Peach was the preferred choice of the Pulitzer Prize jury in 1955, but under pressure from Joseph Pulitzer Jr., the prize instead was given to Tennessee Williams for Cat on a Hot Tin Roof, which the jury had considered the weakest of the five shortlisted nominees.

=== Hollywood ===
The immediate success of Odets's early plays attracted the attention of Hollywood producers. He first went to Hollywood in early 1936 to write for the screen as well as the stage. From this point on he spent most of his life in Hollywood. His initial intention was to make money to help subsidize the Group Theatre's run of his 1935 play Paradise Lost over which the critics were divided, and to help him fulfill his own financial obligations. His first screenplay was produced by Paramount and directed by Lewis Milestone. Starring Gary Cooper and Madeleine Carroll, The General Died at Dawn (1936) received some positive reviews, though Frank Nugent of the New York Times headed his review, "Odets, Where Is thy Sting?"—a phrase that dogged Odets for the rest of his life.

Like most screenwriters of the time, Odets worked within the studio system until independent production companies gained prominence in the 1950s. Thus he often wrote drafts for films such as Rhapsody in Blue and It's a Wonderful Life that were handed to another screenwriter or team for further development. Odets declined to be credited for many of the films on which he worked, but did accept full credit as both screenwriter and director for None but the Lonely Heart (1944), adapted from the novel by Richard Llewellyn and produced by RKO. The film starred Cary Grant, Ethel Barrymore (who won an Oscar for Best Supporting Actress), Barry Fitzgerald, and Jane Wyatt.

Odets wrote the 1957 screenplay for Sweet Smell of Success, based on the novelette and a first draft by Ernest Lehman and produced by the independent company Hecht-Hill-Lancaster. Starring Burt Lancaster and Tony Curtis, this film noir depicts the underbelly of the newspaper world. The character of J. J. Hunsecker, played by Lancaster, was voted the 35th most despicable villain in 100 years of film by the American Film Institute. Odets directed one other film, for which he also wrote the screenplay, The Story on Page One (1959).

Four of Odets's plays—Golden Boy, Clash by Night, The Big Knife and The Country Girl—have been made into films, though Odets did not write the screenplays.

=== House Committee on Un-American Activities ===
The House Committee on Un-American Activities (HUAC) initiated its Hollywood investigation in October 1947. The committee investigated possible subversive communist influences in Hollywood and subpoenaed Odets in April 1952. He first testified in executive session, and on May 19 and 20 he testified in a public hearing.

Odets had belonged to the Communist Party for less than a year between 1934 and 1935 but continued to sponsor many left-wing, progressive groups, some of which were suspected communist fronts. He responded to HUAC's questions and reiterated names of Communist Party members who had been previously cited by his friend and former communist colleague Elia Kazan. Before Kazan's final testimony in April 1952, they agreed to name each other. Odets thereby avoided overt blacklisting, although the committee withheld thanks for his testimony, an omission generally construed as signifying their displeasure. He also found it increasingly difficult to garner film assignments. The negative reactions to his testimony confused him, as he did not consider himself a cooperative witness. A partial transcript of Odets's testimony can be found in Eric Bentley's Thirty Years of Treason.

Odets was tormented by public reaction to his testimony for the rest of his life. In his autobiography, Kazan recalled incidents in which Odets had been accosted in New York City streets and snubbed in Hollywood restaurants after his HUAC appearance. His productivity markedly declined after the hearings. He finished only one play and, while he closely advised other filmmakers such as Nicholas Ray and was in demand as a script doctor, he managed to produce only one entire screenplay of his own (Wild in the Country, starring Elvis Presley) along with his rewrite of Ernest Lehman's Sweet Smell of Success for the production team of Hecht-Hill-Lancaster.

=== Later years ===
In the early 1960s, Odets contracted to write four of a proposed total of 13 teleplays for The Richard Boone Show, NBC's new dramatic anthology born of a plan for televised repertory theater. He also acted as script supervisor. Two of Odets's finished scripts were aired posthumously: "Big Mitch" (December 10, 1963), and "The Mafia Man" (January 7, 1964). Odets also worked on the libretto for a projected musical version of Golden Boy. He died before the project came to fruition. Playwright William Gibson, a former student of Odets's when he taught at the Actors Studio, completed the play's book.

Though many obituaries lamented his work in Hollywood and considered him someone who had not lived up to his promise, Kazan understood it differently. "The tragedy of our times in the theatre is the tragedy of Clifford Odets," Kazan began, before defending his friend against the accusations of failure that had appeared in his obituaries. "His plan, he said, was to ... come back to New York and get [some new] plays on. They'd be, he assured me, the best plays of his life ... Cliff wasn't 'shot.' ... The mind and talent were alive in the man."

=== Personal life ===
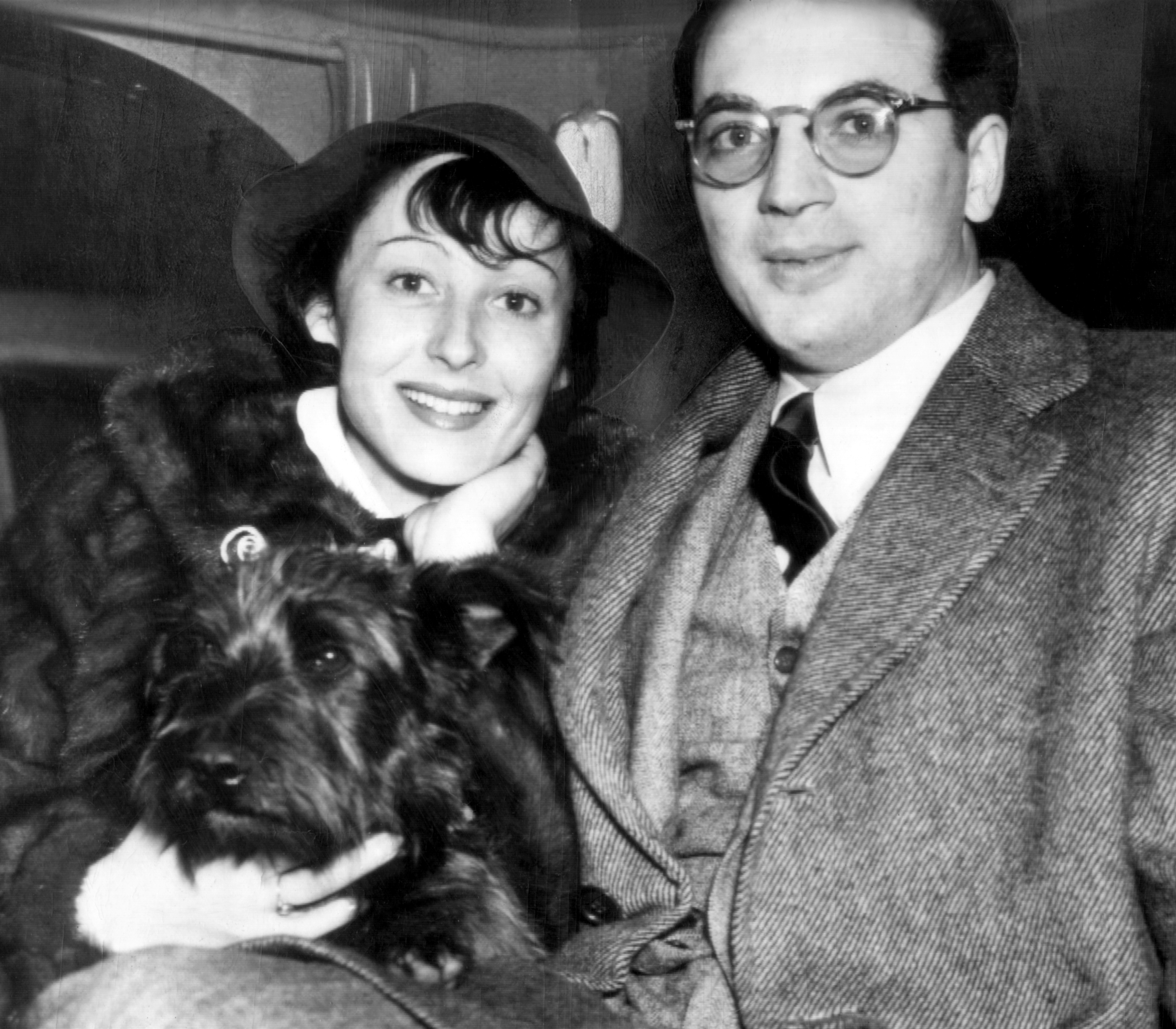
Luise Rainer and Odets in January 1937, shortly before their marriage

Odets married actress Luise Rainer in January 1937, just months before she won her first of two consecutive Academy Awards for Best Actress. They divorced in May 1940. He married actress Bette Grayson in 1943, and the couple had two children: Nora (born in 1945) and Walt (born in 1947). Odets and Grayson divorced in 1951. Nora Odets died at Long Beach, Long Island, in 2008; Walt Odets became a clinical psychologist, author, and photographer residing in Berkeley, California.

Odets also had relationships with actresses Frances Farmer, Kim Stanley, and Fay Wray.

=== Death ===
Odets had long suffered from gastrointestinal distress and on July 23, 1963, was admitted to Cedars of Lebanon Hospital in Los Angeles to undergo treatment for stomach ulcers. During surgery, doctors discovered that he had metastatic stomach cancer. He received bedside visits from such movie and theater friends as Cary Grant, Marlon Brando, Lee Strasberg and Paula Strasberg, Jean Renoir and his wife Dido, Elia Kazan, Harold Clurman, Shirley MacLaine, and Danny Kaye. Renoir dedicated a chapter of his autobiography to his close friendship with Odets. On August 14, 1963, Odets died of stomach cancer at Cedars of Lebanon Hospital at the age of 57.

Odets's ashes were interred in the Forest Lawn Memorial Park, Glendale, in Glendale, California.

== Reputation and legacy ==
Odets's dramatic style is distinguished by a kind of poetic, metaphor-laden street talk. Arthur Miller observed that, with Odets's first plays, "For the very first time in America, language itself ... marked a playwright as unique." Odets's use of local urban speech patterns reflects the influence of Seán O'Casey, another socialist playwright with proletarian concerns. Other hallmarks of Odets's style are his humanistic point of view, and his way of dropping the audience right into the conflict with little or no introduction. Often character is more important than plot, reflecting the influence of Anton Chekhov.

Odets is regarded as one of the American theater's most important playwrights. According to Arthur Miller, "An Odets play was awaited like news hot off the press, as though through him we would know what to think of ourselves and our prospects." Marian Seldes wrote that "Paddy Chayefsky, who felt competitive with Odets, told an interviewer 'There isn't a writer of my generation, especially a New York writer, who doesn't owe his very breath—his entire attitude toward theatre—to Odets.'"

Golden Boy was made into a 1939 film and became the basis for a 1964 musical of the same name. The Flowering Peach became the basis for the 1970 Broadway musical Two by Two, which starred Danny Kaye. Odets's screenplay for Sweet Smell of Success became the basis for the 2002 musical of the same name starring John Lithgow.

Lincoln Center celebrated the centennial of Odets's birth with their 2006 production of Awake and Sing!, directed by Bartlett Sher. It won that year's Tony Award for Best Revival of a Play and sparked an ongoing revival of interest in Odets's work. Another centennial production, Rocket to the Moon, directed by Daniel Fish, was produced by Long Wharf Theater. American Repertory Theater in Cambridge, Massachusetts produced Paradise Lost in 2010, also directed by Daniel Fish. Golden Boy was produced by Lincoln Center with Bartlett Sher again directing. It opened on December 5, 2012, to enthusiastic reviews, subsequently garnering 8 Tony Award nominations. John Lahr declared "In this distinguished, almost symphonic production, Sher and Lincoln Center have done a great thing: they have put Odets finally and forever in the pantheon, where he belongs."

Odets's early, more left-wing plays, such as Waiting for Lefty, Awake and Sing!, and Paradise Lost, have enjoyed numerous revivals since the 2008 economic crash. The Roundabout Theatre Company presented the first revival of Odets's 1949 play The Big Knife in 2013 at the American Airlines Theatre in New York, with Doug Hughes directing Bobby Cannavale in the lead role of Charlie Castle. The role was originated by Odets's former Group Theatre colleague John Garfield. The National Asian American Theatre Company (NAATCO) mounted a highly acclaimed production of Awake and Sing! in 2013 with an all-Asian cast. Performed in a small downtown theatre space in New York's Soho area, the limited run played to sold-out houses. According to New York Times reviewer Anita Gates, "the production easily makes the point that ethnicity is transcended by the humanity of frightened, imperfect people facing unpleasant realities." NAATCO was invited by the Public Theater to revive the production under its auspices in 2015.

Joel and Ethan Coen's 1990 film Barton Fink contains a number of indirect visual and historical references to Odets's personal appearance, background and career. A minor character in the 1982 film Diner speaks only lines from Odets's screenplay for Sweet Smell of Success. The Odets character was played by Jeffrey DeMunn in the film Frances, and by John Heard in the 1983 biography Will There Be A Morning?, both about Frances Farmer.

Odets is mentioned in an episode of the television series Studio 60 on the Sunset Strip, "The Wrap Party." The episode's subplot dealt with The Hollywood Ten.

Odets is a character in Names, Mark Kemble's play about former Group Theatre members' struggles in the blacklist era.

Odets was the subject of a psycho-biography by psychoanalyst Margaret Brenman-Gibson: Clifford Odets – American Playwright – The Years from 1906–1940. It was one component of an umbrella project Brenman-Gibson undertook on the subject of creativity. The biography was intended to be a three-volume work, with the second and third volumes to cover the final 23 years of Odets's life. Brenman-Gibson died in 2004, leaving the project unfinished. A full-length biography of Odets is in progress with the cooperation of the Odets Estate, to be published by Random House Doubleday Knopf.

Apart from Brenman-Gibson's work, six critical biographies have appeared: by R. Baird Shuman (1962); Edward Murray (1968); Michael Mendelsohn (1969); Gerald Weales (1971); Harold Cantor (1978); and Christopher J. Herr (2003).

Odets was named a member of the American Theater Hall of Fame.

== Works and performances ==
=== Stage ===
==== Actor ====
- Midnight (1930)
- Night Over Taos (1931)
- 1931– (1931)
- Big Night (1933)
- They All Come to Moscow (1933)
- Men in White (1933)
- Gold Eagle Guy (1934)
- Waiting for Lefty (1935)

==== Playwright ====
- Waiting for Lefty (1935)
- Awake and Sing! (1935)
- Till the Day I Die (1935)
- Paradise Lost (1935)
- I Can't Sleep (1935, monologue)
- Sarah Bernhardt (1936, radio play)
- The Silent Partner (1936, unproduced)
- Golden Boy (1937)
- Rocket to the Moon (1938)
- Night Music (1940)
- Clash by Night (1941)
- The Russian People (1942, adaptation)
- The Big Knife (1949)
- The Country Girl (1950)
- The Flowering Peach (1954)

==== Director ====
- The Country Girl (1950, original Broadway production)
- Golden Boy (1952, revival)
- The Flowering Peach (1954, original Broadway production)

==== Screenwriter ====
- The General Died at Dawn (1936)
- None but the Lonely Heart (1944)
- Humoresque (1946, screenplay adaptation, with Zachary Gold)
- Notorious (1946, dialogue: love scenes; uncredited)
- Deadline at Dawn (1946)
- Sweet Smell of Success (1957)
- The Story on Page One (1959)
- Wild in the Country (1961)

==== Film director ====
- None but the Lonely Heart (1944)
- The Story on Page One (1959)

==== Acting on screen ====
- The General Died at Dawn (1936) – Minor Role (uncredited)
- Sweet Smell of Success (1957) – Man Outside Theatre (uncredited) (final film role)

=== Bibliography ===
- Introduction to Modern Library edition of Nikolai Gogol's Dead Souls (1936)

== See also ==
- List of Jewish American playwrights
