= Biography (play) =

1932 play by S.N. Behrman

- Written by: S.N. Behrman
- Original language: English

Premiere
- Date premiered: 1932

Biography is a 1932 play by S.N. Behrman.

== Productions ==
Biography premiered on Broadway at the Guild Theatre, running from December 12, 1932 to August 1933. Directed by Philip Moeller, the cast featured Ina Claire as Marion Froude.

The play was produced Off-Broadway by the Manhattan Theatre Club at Stage 73, running from February 26, 1980 to April 6, 1980. Directed by Lynne Meadow, the cast featured Piper Laurie as Marion Froude. The play was produced Off-Broadway at The Pearl Theatre, running from April 2007 to May 2007. Directed by J.R. Sullivan, the cast featured Carolyn McCormick as Marion Froude.
