= My Heart's in the Highlands (play) =

One-act play by William Saroyan

- Author: William Saroyan
- Language: English
- Genre: Play
- Publication date: 1939
- Publication place: United States

My Heart's in the Highlands is a one act play by Armenian-American dramatist and author William Saroyan, adapted from his short story, "The Man with the Heart in the Highlands". Saroyan's first play, it is a comedy about a young boy and his Armenian family. It was produced on Broadway at the Guild Theatre.

== Adaptations ==
Title	Country	Year	Length	Language(s)
Moje je srce visoko u brdima	Yugoslavia	1968	59 min	Serbo-Croatian
The Play of the Week	United States	1960		English
Mijn hart is het Hoogland	Belgium	1960	90 min	Dutch
В горах моё сердце (ru)	Soviet Union	1967	40 min	Russian
My Heart Is in the Highlands	Soviet Union	1976	70 min	Russian, Armenian
Sydämeni on kukkuloilla	Finland	1979		Finnish

== Chamber opera ==
The play was adapted into a chamber opera by U.S. composer Jack Beeson in 1969 and had its world debut on U.S. network National Educational Television, the predecessor of the U.S. Public Broadcasting Service, March 17, 1970. The 90-minute broadcast, directed by pioneering operatic TV director Kirk Browning, was part of the NET Opera Theater series, which aired on NET and then on PBS. The TV broadcast also included, for the first time, simulcast high-fidelity stereo audio. “NET organized links with FM stations throughout the country to broadcast the stereo soundtrack of My Heart’s in the Highlands simultaneously with the telecast,” writes Brian G. Rose, professor of communication and media studies at New York’s Fordham University. “By turning off the volume of their televisions and turning on their stereos, home viewers could now have the chance to hear opera with extraordinary fidelity and range. The technique would become an important adjunct of non-commercial television’s music programming from that point onward.”
