= Professional School of Psychology =

Graduate school of psychology in California, USA

Coordinates: 38.6301°N 121.3827°W

The Professional School of Psychology is a school in Sacramento, California, USA that offers workshops and certificates in psychology. It was previously an unaccredited university that offered PsyD programs that allowed graduates to obtain licensure in California.
