= 22nd Tony Awards =

1968 US theatrical awards ceremony

- Date: April 21, 1968
- Location: Shubert Theatre, New York City, New York
- Hosted by: Angela Lansbury and Peter Ustinov
- Most wins: Hallelujah, Baby! (5)
- Most nominations: The Happy Time (10)

Television/radio coverage
- Network: NBC

The 22nd Annual Tony Awards was held on April 21, 1968, at the Shubert Theatre and broadcast on television by NBC. Hosts were Angela Lansbury and Peter Ustinov, assisted by Jack Benny and with Alfred Drake doing narration.

== Eligibility ==
Shows that opened on Broadway during the 1967–1968 season before April 5, 1968 are eligible.

Original plays

- After the Rain
- Avanti!
- Before You Go
- The Birthday Party
- Brief Lives
- By George
- Daphne in Cottage D
- A Day in the Death of Joe Egg
- Dr. Cook's Garden
- Everything in the Garden
- Exit the King
- The Freaking Out of Stephanie Blake
- The Girl in the Freudian Slip
- The Guide
- Halfway Up the Tree
- How to Be a Jewish Mother
- I Never Sang for My Father
- Johnny No-Trump
- Keep It In the Family
- Little Murders
- Loot
- A Minor Adjustment
- Mirele Efros
- More Stately Mansions
- The Natural Look
- The Ninety Day Mistress
- Pantagleize
- Plaza Suite
- Portrait of a Queen
- The Price
- The Prime of Miss Jean Brodie
- The Promise
- Rosencrantz and Guildenstern Are Dead
- The Seven Descents of Myrtle
- Something Different
- Song of the Grasshopper
- Spofford
- Staircase
- The Natural Look
- That Summer - That Fall
- There's a Girl in My Soup
- The Trial of Lee Harvey Oswald
- The Unknown Soldier and His Wife
- War and Peace
- A Warm Body
- Weekend
- What Did We Do Wrong?
- You Know I Can't Hear You When the Water's Running

Original musicals

- Darling of the Day
- The Education of H*Y*M*A*N K*A*P*L*A*N
- Golden Rainbow
- The Grand Music Hall of Israel
- Hallelujah, Baby!
- The Happy Time
- Hello, Solly!
- Henry, Sweet Henry
- Here's Where I Belong
- How Now, Dow Jones
- Illya Darling
- Sherry!

Play revivals

- The Cherry Orchard
- Fumed Oak
- Galileo
- The Imaginary Invalid
- The Little Foxes
- Mother Courage and Her Children
- Saint Joan
- The Show-Off
- Still Life
- A Touch of the Poet
- Tiger at the Gates
- Ways and Means

== The ceremony ==
The theme of this year's awards ceremony was to salute previous Tony Award-winning musicals.

Presenters: Anne Bancroft, Shirley Booth, Art Carney, Trudy Carson, Diahann Carroll, Carol Cole, Sandy Dennis, Audrey Hepburn, Jerry Herman, Anne Jackson, Alan King, Groucho Marx, Liza Minnelli, Paul Newman, Gregory Peck, Harold Prince, Tony Randall, Eli Wallach, Joanne Woodward.

Musicals represented:

- Golden Rainbow ("Twenty-Four Hours a Day" - Company);
- The Happy Time ("The Happy Time"/"A Certain Girl" - Robert Goulet, David Wayne, Michael Rupert)
- Fiddler on the Roof ("Matchmaker, Matchmaker" - Tanya Everett, Bette Midler, Mimi Turque)
- Cabaret ("Cabaret" - Jill Haworth)
- Man of La Mancha ("The Impossible Dream" - David Atkinson)
- Hello, Dolly! ("Put on Your Sunday Clothes"/"So Long, Dearie" - Pearl Bailey and Company)
- How Now, Dow Jones ("Step to the Rear" - Tony Roberts and Company)
- Hallelujah, Baby! ("Smile, Smile" - Leslie Uggams, Lillian Hayman, Robert Hooks)

== Award winners and nominees ==
Winners are in bold

Best Play	Best Musical
**Rosencrantz and Guildenstern Are Dead – Tom Stoppard**; A Day in the Death of Joe Egg – Peter Nichols; Plaza Suite – Neil Simon; The Price – Arthur Miller	**Hallelujah, Baby!**; The Happy Time; How Now, Dow Jones; Illya Darling
Best Performance by a Leading Actor in a Play	Best Performance by a Leading Actress in a Play
**Martin Balsam – You Know I Can't Hear You When the Water's Running as Various Characters**; Albert Finney – A Day in the Death of Joe Egg as Bri; Milo O'Shea – Staircase as Harry C. Leeds; Alan Webb – I Never Sang for My Father as Tom Garrison	**Zoe Caldwell – The Prime of Miss Jean Brodie as Jean Brodie**; Colleen Dewhurst – More Stately Mansions as Sara; Maureen Stapleton – Plaza Suite as Various Characters; Dorothy Tutin – Portrait of a Queen as Victoria
Best Performance by a Leading Actor in a Musical	Best Performance by a Leading Actress in a Musical
**Robert Goulet – The Happy Time as Jacques Bonnard**; Robert Hooks – Hallelujah, Baby! as Clem; Tony Roberts – How Now, Dow Jones as Charley; David Wayne – The Happy Time as Grandpere Bonnard	**Patricia Routledge – Darling of the Day as Alice Challice**; **Leslie Uggams – Hallelujah, Baby! as Georgina**; Melina Mercouri – Illya Darling as Illya; Brenda Vaccaro – How Now, Dow Jones as Cynthia Pike
Best Performance by a Supporting or Featured Actor in a Play	Best Performance by a Supporting or Featured Actress in a Play
**James Patterson – The Birthday Party as Stanley**; Paul Hecht – Rosencrantz and Guildenstern Are Dead as The Player; Brian Murray – Rosencrantz and Guildenstern Are Dead as Rosencrantz; John Wood – Rosencrantz and Guildenstern Are Dead as Guildenstern	**Zena Walker – A Day in the Death of Joe Egg as Sheila**; Pert Kelton – Spofford as Mrs. Punck; Ruth White – The Birthday Party as Meg; Eleanor Wilson – Weekend as Mrs. Andrews
Best Performance by a Supporting or Featured Actor in a Musical	Best Performance by a Supporting or Featured Actress in a Musical
**Hiram Sherman – How Now, Dow Jones as Wingate**; Scott Jacoby – Golden Rainbow as Ally; Nikos Kourkoulos – Illya Darling as Tonio; Michael Rupert – The Happy Time as Bibi Bonnard	**Lillian Hayman – Hallelujah, Baby! as Momma**; Geula Gill – The Grand Music Hall of Israel as Various Characters; Julie Gregg – The Happy Time as Laurie Mannon; Alice Playten – Henry, Sweet Henry as Lillian 'Lili' Kafritz
Best Direction of a Play	Best Direction of a Musical
**Mike Nichols – Plaza Suite**; Michael Blakemore – A Day in the Death of Joe Egg; Derek Goldby – Rosencrantz and Guildenstern Are Dead; Alan Schneider – You Know I Can't Hear You When the Water's Running	**Gower Champion – The Happy Time**; George Abbott – How Now, Dow Jones; Jules Dassin – Illya Darling; Burt Shevelove – Hallelujah, Baby!
Best Producer (Dramatic)	Best Producer (Musical)
**David Merrick Arts Foundation – Rosencrantz and Guildenstern Are Dead**; No nominees	**Albert Selden, Hal James, Jane C. Nusbaum and Harry Rigby – Hallelujah, Baby!**; No nominees
Best Original Score (Music and/or Lyrics) Written for the Theatre	Best Choreography
**Hallelujah, Baby! – Jule Styne (music) and Betty Comden and Adolph Green (lyrics)**; How Now, Dow Jones – Elmer Bernstein (music) and Carolyn Leigh (lyrics); Illya Darling – Manos Hadjidakis (music) and Joe Darion (lyrics); The Happy Time – John Kander (music) and Fred Ebb (lyrics)	**Gower Champion – The Happy Time**; Michael Bennett – Henry, Sweet Henry; Kevin Carlisle – Hallelujah, Baby!; Onna White – Illya Darling
Best Scenic Design	Best Costume Design
**Desmond Heeley – Rosencrantz and Guildenstern Are Dead**; Boris Aronson – The Price; Robert Randolph – Golden Rainbow; Peter Wexler – The Happy Time	**Desmond Heeley – Rosencrantz and Guildenstern Are Dead**; Jane Greenwood – More Stately Mansions; Irene Sharaff – Hallelujah, Baby!; Freddy Wittop – The Happy Time

== Special awards ==
- Audrey Hepburn
- Carol Channing
- Pearl Bailey
- David Merrick
- Maurice Chevalier
- APA-Phoenix Theatre
- Marlene Dietrich

=== Multiple nominations and awards ===
These productions had multiple nominations:

- 10 nominations: The Happy Time
- 9 nominations: Hallelujah, Baby!
- 8 nominations: Rosencrantz and Guildenstern Are Dead
- 6 nominations: How Now, Dow Jones and Illya Darling
- 4 nominations: A Day in the Death of Joe Egg
- 3 nominations: Plaza Suite
- 2 nominations: The Birthday Party, Golden Rainbow, Henry, Sweet Henry, More Stately Mansions, The Price and You Know I Can't Hear You When the Water's Running

The following productions received multiple awards.

- 5 wins: Hallelujah, Baby!
- 4 wins: Rosencrantz and Guildenstern Are Dead
- 3 wins: The Happy Time

== See also ==
- 40th Academy Awards
