= List of the shortest-running Broadway shows =

This is a list of Broadway shows with 20 or fewer regular performances. The list only includes shows that had open-ended runs or limited runs that ended earlier than planned. The shows must have officially opened on Broadway, and thus productions that closed during previews are not included.

== List ==
Unless otherwise noted, the run count listed is for the original Broadway production of the show. M denotes a musical, P denotes a straight play, R denotes revue, D denotes a predominantly dance musical, and S denotes a special case.

No.	Title	Type	Opening date	Closing date	Perfs.	Prevs.	Comment	Ref.
1.	A Broadway Musical	M	December 21, 1978	December 21, 1978	1	14		
1.	A Teaspoon Every Four Hours	P	June 14, 1969	June 14, 1969	1	97	Opening night was originally scheduled for April 3, 1969, and was delayed multiple times.	
1.	Billy	M	March 22, 1969	March 22, 1969	1	21		
1.	Blood Red Roses	M	March 22, 1970	March 22, 1970	1	20		
1.	Break a Leg	R	April 29, 1979	April 29, 1979	1	12		
1.	Brightower	P	January 28, 1970	January 28, 1970	1	7		
1.	Broadway Follies	R	March 15, 1981	March 15, 1981	1	14		
1.	Cleavage	M	June 23, 1982	June 23, 1982	1	6		
1.	The Cuban Thing	P	September 24, 1968	September 24, 1968	1	12		
1.	Dance a Little Closer	M	May 11, 1983	May 11, 1983	1	25		
1.	Eyes	P	May 19, 1930	May 19, 1930	1			
1.	Fame	P	November 18, 1974	November 18, 1974	1	8		
1.	Father's Day	P	March 16, 1971	March 16, 1971	1	16	Second of Oliver Hailey's three Broadway plays, all of which closed on opening night. Nominated for two Tonys, including Jo Mielziner for Best Scenic Design and Marian Seldes for Best Actress. Seldes also won a Drama Desk award for Outstanding Performance.	
1.	First One Asleep, Whistle	P	February 26, 1966	February 26, 1966	1	13	First of three Broadway plays written by Oliver Hailey, all of which closed on opening night.	
1.	Frank Merriwell	M	April 24, 1971	April 24, 1971	1	7		
1.	Frankenstein	P	January 4, 1981	January 4, 1981	1	29		
1.	Gandhi	P	October 20, 1970	October 20, 1970	1			
1.	Gantry	M	February 14, 1970	February 14, 1970	1	31		
1.	The Garden of Sweets	P	October 31, 1961	October 31, 1961	1	1		
1.	Glory Days	M	May 6, 2008	May 6, 2008	1	17		
1.	The Goodbye People (1979 revival)	P	April 30, 1979	April 30, 1979	1	16	The original production ran for 7 performances	
1.	Gorey Stories: An Entertainment with Music	P	October 30, 1978	October 30, 1978	1	16		
1.	Happiness Is Just a Little Thing Called a Rolls Royce	P	May 11, 1968	May 11, 1968	1	3		
1.	Have I Got A Girl For You!	P	December 30, 1963	December 30, 1963	1			
1.	Heathen!	M	May 21, 1972	May 21, 1972	1	6		
1.	Here's Where I Belong	M	March 3, 1968	March 3, 1968	1	20		
1.	Home Sweet Homer	M	January 4, 1976	January 4, 1976	1	11		
1.	I Won't Dance	P	May 10, 1981	May 10, 1981	1	7	Third and final Broadway play by written by Oliver Hailey, all of which closed on opening night	
1.	Johnny No-Trump	P	October 8, 1967	October 8, 1967	1	5		
1.	Julia, Jake and Uncle Joe	P	January 28, 1961	January 28, 1961	1			
1.	Kelly	M	February 6, 1965	February 6, 1965	1	7		
1.	La Strada	M	December 14, 1969	December 14, 1969	1	12		
1.	Let Me Hear You Smile	P	January 16, 1973	January 16, 1973	1	8		
1.	Little Johnny Jones (1982 revival)	M	March 21, 1982	March 21, 1982	1	29	The original production ran for 52 performances	
1.	Masquerade	P	March 16, 1959	March 16, 1959	1			
1.	Me and Thee	P	December 7, 1965	December 7, 1965	1	7		
1.	A Meeting by the River	P	March 28, 1979	March 28, 1979	1	10		
1.	The Moony Shapiro Songbook	M	May 3, 1981	May 3, 1981	1	15		
1.	Moose Murders	P	February 22, 1983	February 22, 1983	1	13		
1.	The Mother Lover	P	February 1, 1969	February 1, 1969	1	13		
1.	The Natural Look	P	March 11, 1967	March 11, 1967	1	18		
1.	Ned and Jack	P	November 8, 1981	November 8, 1981	1	10		
1.	No Hard Feelings	P	April 8, 1973	April 8, 1973	1	21		
1.	Oldest Living Confederate Widow Tells All	P	November 17, 2003	November 17, 2003	1	19		
1.	Once There Was a Russian	P	February 18, 1961	February 18, 1961	1	1		
1.	Onward Victoria	M	December 14, 1980	December 14, 1980	1	23	Closing notice already in place on the night the play opened.	
1.	A Place for Polly	P	April 18, 1970	April 18, 1970	1	9		
1.	Play Me a Country Song	M	June 27, 1982	June 27, 1982	1	14		
1.	Rainbow Jones	M	February 13, 1974	February 13, 1974	1	3		
1.	Ring Around the Bathtub	P	April 29, 1972	April 29, 1972	1	3		
1.	The Ritz (1983 revival)	P	May 2, 1983	May 2, 1983	1	14	The original production ran for 398 performances	
1.	Stages	P	March 19, 1978	March 19, 1978	1	13		
1.	Step on a Crack	P	October 17, 1962	October 17, 1962	1	1		
1.	Take Me Along (1985 revival)	M	April 14, 1985	April 14, 1985	1	7	The original production ran for 448 performances	
1.	Total Abandon	P	April 28, 1983	April 28, 1983	1	7		
1.	The Utter Glory of Morrissey Hall	M	May 13, 1979	May 13, 1979	1	7		
1.	The Watering Place	P	March 12, 1969	March 12, 1969	1	6		
1.	Wild and Wonderful	M	December 7, 1971	December 7, 1971	1	9		
59.	The Cool World	P	February 22, 1960	February 23, 1960	2			
59.	Gabrielle	P	March 25, 1941	March 26, 1941	2			
59.	Medea and Jason	P	October 2, 1974	October 2, 1974	2	10	The show opened on a matinée performance and closed after the evening performance that same day.	
59.	Signature	P	February 14, 1945	February 15, 1945	2			
59.	Springtime Folly	P	February 26, 1951	February 27, 1951	2			
59.	Teaneck Tanzi: The Venus Flytrap	P	April 20, 1983	April 20, 1983	2	13	The show opened on a matinée performance and closed after the evening performance that same day.	
65.	Cafe Crown	M	April 17, 1964	April 17, 1964	3	30		
65.	Into the Whirlwind	P	November 15, 1996	November 16, 1996	3		The production played in repertory with The Three Sisters at the Lunt-Fontanne Theatre. Both were performed in Russian.	
65.	Nathan Weinstein, Mystic, Connecticut	P	February 25, 1966	February 26, 1966	3	4		
65.	Oh, Brother!	M	November 10, 1981	November 11, 1981	3	13		
65.	Portofino	M	February 21, 1958	February 22, 1958	3			
65.	Requiem for a Heavyweight	P	March 7, 1985	March 9, 1985	3	8	John Lithgow was nominated for the Tony Award for Best Actor In a Play for his performance.	
65.	Soon	M	January 12, 1971	January 13, 1971	3	21		
65.	Ti-coq	P	February 9, 1951	February 10, 1951	3			
65.	The Yearling	M	December 10, 1965	December 11, 1965	3	11		
65.	Your Loving Son	P	April 4, 1941	April 5, 1941	3			
74.	A Race of Hairy Men!	P	April 29, 1965	May 1, 1965	4	12		
74.	All You Need Is One Good Break	P	February 9, 1950	February 11, 1950	4			
74.	The Barrier	M	November 2, 1950	November 4, 1950	4			
74.	Bosoms and Neglect	P	May 3, 1979	May 5, 1979	4	7		
74.	Bring Back Birdie	M	March 5, 1981	March 7, 1981	4	31		
74.	But, Seriously...	P	February 27, 1969	March 1, 1969	4	13		
74.	Children From Their Games	P	April 11, 1963	April 13, 1963	4	2		
74.	Conscience	P	May 15, 1952	May 17, 1952	4			
74.	Einstein and the Polar Bear	P	October 29, 1981	October 31, 1981	4	20		
74.	Good as Gold	P	March 7, 1957	March 9, 1957	4			
74.	Horses in Midstream	P	April 2, 1953	April 4, 1953	4			
74.	The Fig Leaves Are Falling	M	January 2, 1969	January 6, 1969	4	17	Dorothy Loudon was nominated for the Tony Award for Best Actress in a Musical for her performance in the show.	
74.	In the Counting House	P	December 13, 1962	December 15, 1962	4	2		
74.	The Innkeepers	P	February 2, 1956	February 4, 1956	4			
74.	Late Nite Comic	M	October 15, 1987	October 17, 1987	4	15		
74.	Minor Miracle	P	October 7, 1965	October 9, 1965	4	11		
74.	Murder at the Howard Johnson's	P	May 17, 1979	May 20, 1979	4	10		
74.	Rags	M	August 21, 1986	August 23, 1986	4	18	Nominated for the Tony Award for Best Musical	
74.	The Roast	P	May 8, 1980	May 10, 1980	4	9		
74.	Song of the Grasshopper	P	September 28, 1967	September 30, 1967	4	4		
74.	Xmas in Las Vegas	P	November 4, 1965	November 6, 1965	4	9		
74.	Rob Lake Magic With Special Guests The Muppets	S	November 6, 2025	November 16, 2025	4	20	This marked the debut of The Muppets on Broadway	
96.	Agatha Sue, I Love You	P	December 14, 1966	December 17, 1966	5	2		
96.	A Doll's Life	M	September 23, 1982	September 26, 1982	5	18		
96.	Angel	M	May 10, 1978	May 13, 1978	5	6	Frances Sternhagen was nominated for the Tony Award for Best Actress in a Musical	
96.	Be Your Age	P	January 14, 1953	January 17, 1953	5			
96.	Carrie	M	May 12, 1988	May 15, 1988	5	16		
96.	Charlotte	P	February 27, 1980	March 1, 1980	5	20		
96.	Devour the Snow	P	November 7, 1979	November 10, 1979	5	8		
96.	Diamond Orchid	P	February 10, 1965	February 13, 1965	5	1		
96.	Do Black Patent Leather Shoes Really Reflect Up?	M	May 27, 1982	May 30, 1982	5	15		
96.	Doctor Jazz	M	March 19, 1975	March 22, 1975	5	42		
96.	The Exercise	P	April 24, 1968	April 27, 1968	5	10		
96.	The Gingham Dog	P	April 23, 1969	April 26, 1969	5	19		
96.	Happy Town	M	October 7, 1959	October 10, 1959	5			
96.	Legend	P	May 13, 1976	May 15, 1976	5	18		
96.	The Life of Reilly	P	April 29, 1942	May 2, 1942	5			
96.	Look, We've Come Through	P	October 25, 1961	October 28, 1961	5			
96.	More to Love	P	October 15, 1998	October 17, 1998	5	16		
96.	Park	M	April 22, 1970	April 25, 1970	5	5		
96.	Peg: A Musical Autobiography	M	December 14, 1983	December 17, 1983	5	13		
96.	Play Memory	P	April 26, 1984	April 29, 1984	5	7		
96.	Prymate	P	May 5, 2004	May 8, 2004	5	22		
96.	Raggedy Ann	M	October 16, 1986	October 19, 1986	5	15		
96.	The Red Shoes	M	December 16, 1993	December 19, 1993	5	51		
96.	Ring Two	P	November 22, 1939	November 25, 1939	5			
96.	See the Jaguar	P	December 3, 1952	December 6, 1952	5			
96.	Seven Brides for Seven Brothers	M	July 8, 1982	July 11, 1982	5	15		
96.	Star-Spangled Family	P	April 10, 1945	April 13, 1945	5			
96.	The Story of My Life	M	February 19, 2009	February 22, 2009	5	19		
96.	The Sudden and Accidental Re-Education of Horse Johnson	P	December 18, 1968	December 21, 1968	5	3		
96.	The Three Sisters	P	November 7, 1996	November 13, 1996	5		The production played in repertory with Into the Whirlwind at the Lunt-Fontanne Theatre. Both were performed in Russian.	
96.	Woman Bites Dog	P	April 17, 1946	April 20, 1946	5			
96.	Zelda	P	March 5, 1969	March 8, 1969	5	10		
127.	Carnival in Flanders	M	September 8, 1953	September 12, 1953	6		Leading lady Dolores Gray won the Tony Award for Best Actress in a Musical, thus holding the record for Tony-winning performance with the briefest run.	
127.	Horowitz and Mrs. Washington	P	April 2, 1980	April 6, 1980	6	10		
127.	Into the Light	M	October 22, 1986	October 26, 1986	6	13		
127.	The Performers	P	November 14, 2012	November 18, 2012	6	24		
127.	Siege	P	December 8, 1937	December 11, 1937	6			
132.	Buttrio Square	M	October 14, 1952	October 18, 1952	7			
132.	The Genius and the Goddess	P	December 10, 1957	December 14, 1957	7			
132.	The Goodbye People	P	December 3, 1968	December 7, 1968	7	16	A 1979 revival closed on opening night	
132.	High	P	April 19, 2011	April 24, 2011	7	29		
132.	I'll Take The High Road	P	November 9, 1943	November 13, 1943	7			
132.	La Grosse Valise	M	December 14, 1965	December 18, 1965	7	12		
132.	The Night Circus	P	December 2, 1958	December 6, 1958	7			
132.	Patate	P	October 28, 1958	November 1, 1958	7			
132.	Rockabye Hamlet	M	February 17, 1976	February 21, 1976	7	21		
132.	Slapstick Tragedy	P	February 22, 1966	February 26, 1966	7	16	Zoe Caldwell won the Tony Award for Best Actress in a Play for her performance in the show.	
132.	Via Galactica	M	November 28, 1972	December 2, 1972	7	15		
132.	We Interrupt This Program...	P	April 1, 1975	April 5, 1975	7	21		
132.	The Wrong Way Light Bulb	P	March 4, 1969	March 8, 1969	7	17		
145.	American Buffalo	P	November 17, 2008	November 24, 2008	8	20		
145.	Arturo Ui	P	November 11, 1963	November 16, 1963	8	5		
145.	Dr. Cook's Garden	P	September 25, 1967	September 30, 1967	8	6		
145.	Drat! The Cat!	M	October 10, 1965	October 16, 1965	8	11		
145.	Got Tu Go Disco	M	June 25, 1979	June 30, 1979	8	9		
145.	It's So Nice to Be Civilized	M	June 3, 1980	June 8, 1980	8	23		
145.	Kiss Me, Kate (1952 revival)	M	January 8, 1952	January 13, 1952	8		The original production ran for 1,077 performances.	
145.	The Leaf People	P	October 20, 1975	October 26, 1975	8	42		
145.	Love is a Time of Day	P	December 22, 1969	December 27, 1969	8	16		
145.	Voices	P	April 3, 1972	April 8, 1972	8	8		
145.	Who's Who in Hell	P	December 9, 1974	December 14, 1974	8	8		
145.	Women of Twilight	P	March 3, 1952	March 8, 1952	8			
156.	Ambassador	M	November 19, 1972	November 25, 1972	9	12		
156.	Anyone Can Whistle	M	April 4, 1964	April 11, 1964	9	12		
156.	The Blonde in the Thunderbird	S	July 17, 2005	July 23, 2005	9	10	The limited run was originally scheduled to end on September 3, 2005.	
156.	Brighton Beach Memoirs (2009 revival)	P	October 25, 2009	November 1, 2009	9	25	The original production ran for 1,299 performances	
156.	Elling	P	November 21, 2010	November 28, 2010	9	22		
156.	The Lieutenant	M	March 9, 1975	March 16, 1975	9	7	Nominated for the Tony Award for Best Musical	
156.	Nick & Nora	M	December 8, 1991	December 15, 1991	9	71		
156.	The Paisley Convertible	P	February 11, 1967	February 18, 1967	9	18		
156.	Rock 'N Roll! The First 5,000 Years	R	October 24, 1982	October 31, 1982	9	25		
156.	Safe Sex	P	April 5, 1987	April 12, 1987	9	21		
156.	The Three Musketeers (1984 revival)	M	November 11, 1984	November 18, 1984	9	15	The original production ran for 318 performances	
156.	We Have Always Lived in the Castle	M	October 19, 1966	October 26, 1966	9	2		
168.	Cloud 7	M	February 14, 1958	February 28, 1958	11			
168.	The Story of Mary Surratt	P	February 7, 1947	February 14, 1947	11			
170.	A Joyful Noise	M	December 15, 1966	December 24, 1966	12	4		
170.	The American Clock	P	November 20, 1980	November 30, 1980	12	11		
170.	Dreyfus in Rehearsal	P	October 17, 1974	October 26, 1974	12	3		
170.	Fearless Frank	M	June 15, 1980	June 25, 1980	12	13		
170.	P.S. I Love You	P	November 19, 1964	November 28, 1964	12	3		
170.	The Lady from Dubuque	P	January 31, 1980	February 9, 1980	12	8		
170.	Lolita	P	March 19, 1981	March 28, 1981	12	31		
170.	Saturday Sunday Monday	P	November 21, 1974	November 30, 1974	12	4		
170.	Seagulls Over Sorrento	P	September 11, 1952	September 20, 1952	12			
170.	The Secret Rapture	P	October 26, 1989	November 4, 1989	12	19		
170.	The Threepenny Opera	M	April 13, 1933	April 22, 1933	12			
170.	Wally's Cafe	P	June 12, 1981	June 21, 1981	12	31		
170.	Welcome to the Club	M	April 13, 1989	April 22, 1989	12	20		
170.	What's Wrong With This Picture?	P	December 8, 1994	December 18, 1994	12	27		
183.	Great Day in the Morning	P	March 28, 1962	April 7, 1962	13	1		
183.	Macbeth (2000 revival)	P	June 15, 2000	June 25, 2000	13	8	The limited run ended 5 weeks earlier than originally planned.	
183.	Metro	M	April 16, 1992	April 26, 1992	13	24		
183.	Moby Dick	P	November 28, 1962	December 8, 1962	13			
183.	The Wiz (1984 revival)	M	May 24, 1984	June 3, 1984	13	7	The original production ran for 1,672 performances.	
183.	A Woman of Independent Means	P	May 3, 1984	May 13, 1984	13	12		
189.	Flare Path	P	December 23, 1942	January 2, 1943	14			
189.	High Fidelity	M	December 7, 2006	December 17, 2006	14	18		
189.	Jackie Mason's Laughing Room Only	R	November 19, 2003	November 30, 2003	14	31		
189.	Purlie (1972 revival)	M	December 27, 1972	January 7, 1973	14	2	The original production ran for 688 performances.	
193.	Captain Brassbound's Conversion (1951 revival)	P	December 27, 1950	January 7, 1951	15	Originally staged in 1907, a 1972 revival ran for 16 performances.		
193.	Last Licks	P	November 20, 1979	December 1, 1979	15	10		
193.	The Passion of Josef D.	P	February 11, 1964	February 22, 1964	15	1		
196.	The Best Little Whorehouse Goes Public	M	May 10, 1994	May 22, 1994	16	28		
196.	Captain Brassbound's Conversion (1972 revival)	P	April 17, 1972	April 29, 1972	16		Originally staged in 1907, a 1951 revival ran for 15 performances.	
196.	P.S. Your Cat is Dead	P	April 7, 1975	Apr 20, 1975	16	5		
196.	Dude	M	October 9, 1972	October 21, 1972	16	16		
196.	Enron	P	April 27, 2010	May 9, 2010	16	22		
196.	The Man Who Had Three Arms	P	April 5, 1983	April 17, 1983	16	8		
196.	Merrily We Roll Along	M	November 16, 1981	November 28, 1981	16	44		
196.	Nellie Bly	M	January 21, 1946	February 2, 1946	16			
196.	Oh, Kay! (1928 revival)	M	January 2, 1928	January 14, 1928	16		The original production ran for 256 performances	
196.	Passione	P	September 23, 1980	October 5, 1980	16	11		
205.	Amour	M	October 20, 2002	November 3, 2002	17	31	Nominated for the Tony Award for Best Musical	
205.	The Caine Mutiny Court-Martial (2006 revival)	P	May 7, 2006	May 21, 2006	17	27		
205.	Charlie and Algernon	M	September 14, 1980	September 28, 1980	17	12	Nominated for the Tony Award for Best Original Score	
205.	KPOP	M	November 27, 2022	December 11, 2022	17	44		
209.	Leap of Faith	M	April 26, 2012	May 13, 2012	19	25	Nominated for the Tony Award for Best Musical	
209.	Lovely Ladies, Kind Gentlemen	M	December 28, 1970	January 9, 1971	19	3		
211.	All About Me	M	March 18, 2010	April 4, 2010	20	27		
211.	The Climate of Eden	P	November 6, 1952	November 22, 1952	20			

== Shows that closed during previews ==
The following shows started previews but did not officially open on Broadway:

- Infidel Caesar (1962 play) — closed after 1 preview performance
- Venus Is (1966 play) — closed after 7 preview performances
- The Office (1966 play) — closed after 10 preview performances
- Breakfast at Tiffany's (1966 musical) — closed after 4 preview performances
- The Freaking Out of Stephanie Blake (1967 play) — closed after 3 preview performances
- Leda Had a Little Swan (1968 play) — closed after 14 preview performances
- A Way of Life (1969 play) — closed after 9 preview performances
- Rachael Lily Rosenbloom (And Don't You Ever Forget It) (1973 musical) — closed after 7 preview performances
- Truckload (1975 musical) — closed after 6 preview performances
- Me Jack, You Jill (1976 play) — closed after 16 preview performances
- Let My People Come (1976 revue) — closed after 128 preview performances
- One Night Stand (1980 musical) — closed after 8 preview performances
- A Reel American Hero (1981 musical) — closed after 5 preview performances
- The Little Prince and the Aviator (1981 musical) — closed after 16 preview performances
- Senator Joe (1989 musical) — closed after 3 preview performances
- Face Value (1993 play) — closed after 8 preview performances
- Bobbi Boland (2003 play) — closed after 7 preview performances
- Who's Afraid of Virginia Woolf? (2020 revival) — closed after 9 preview performances due to the COVID-19 Broadway shutdown.

== See also ==
- List of the longest-running Broadway shows
- Long-running plays
