= The Season: A Candid Look at Broadway =

Book by William Goldman

- First edition
- Author: William Goldman
- Language: English
- Publisher: Harcourt, Brace & World
- Publication date: 1969
- Publication place: United States

The Season: A Candid Look at Broadway is an account of the 1967–1968 season on and off-Broadway by American novelist and screenwriter William Goldman. It originally was published in 1969 and is considered one of the better books ever written on American theater. In The New York Times, Christopher Lehmann-Haupt called the book “Very nearly perfect...It is a loose-limbed, gossipy, insider, savvy, nuts-and-bolts report on the annual search for the winning numbers that is now big-time American commercial theatre.”

Goldman reports in the book that he spent over 18 months of reporting on the book, seeing every show on Broadway, many of them more than once, as well as preview productions in the principal try-out towns like Boston, New Haven, and Washington, D.C.

The book is presented roughly in chronological order throughout the season. It analyzes the Broadway audience and the economics of Broadway theatre at the time as well as the shows given during the season, and it profiles or interviews the significant theatrical personalities of the day.

== Plays ==
The plays and musicals described include:

- After the Rain by John Griffith Bowen
- Avanti! by Samuel Taylor
- Before You Go
- The Birthday Party by Harold Pinter
- The Boys in the Band by Mart Crowley
- Brief Lives, starring Roy Dotrice
- By George starring Max Adrian about the letters of George Bernard Shaw
- Carry Me Back to Morningside Heights by Robert Alan Aurthur, directed by Sidney Poitier
- Daphne in Cottage D, starring Sandy Dennis and William Daniels
- A Day in the Death of Joe Egg by Peter Nichols starring Albert Finney and Zena Walker directed by Michael Blakemore
- Darling of the Day, starring Vincent Price
- Dr. Cook's Garden by Ira Levin, starring Burl Ives and Keir Dullea, originally directed by George C. Scott
- Eddie Fisher and Buddy Hackett at the Palace
- The Education of H*Y*M*A*N K*A*P*L*A*N, directed by George Abbott with Tom Bosley
- Everything in the Garden by Edward Albee
- The Exercise by Lewis John Carlino with Anne Jackson
- The Freaking Out of Stephanie Blake, starring Jean Arthur
- George M! starring Joel Grey, directed by Joe Layton
- Golden Rainbow, starring Eydie Gormé and Steve Lawrence
- The Grand Music Hall of Israel
- The Guide by Harvey Breit and Patricia Rinehart
- Hair
- Halfway Up the Tree by Peter Ustinov
- Happiness Is Just a Little Thing Called a Rolls Royce
- The Happy Time by Kander and Ebb, directed by Gower Champion with Robert Goulet
- Henry, Sweet Henry by Bob Merrill and Nunnally Johnson with Don Ameche, directed by George Roy Hill
- Here's Where I Belong by Terrence McNally and others
- How Now, Dow Jones, directed by George Abbott, music by Elmer Bernstein
- How to Be a Jewish Mother
- I Never Sang for My Father by Robert Anderson with Lillian Gish
- I'm Solomon
- Johnny No-Trump by Mary Mercier
- Judy Garland "At Home at the Palace" with Judy Garland
- Keep It In the Family by Bill Naughton
- Leda Had a Little Swan with Michael J. Pollard
- The Little Foxes by Lillian Hellman, directed by Mike Nichols with George C. Scott and Anne Bancroft
- Leonard Sillman's New Faces of 1968, produced by Leonard Sillman
- Loot by Joe Orton
- Mata Hari, directed by Vincente Minnelli, produced by David Merrick
- Mike Downstairs
- A Minor Adjustment
- More Stately Mansions by Eugene O'Neill, starring Ingrid Bergman and Colleen Dewhurst, directed by Jose Quintero
- The Ninety Day Mistress with Dyan Cannon
- The Only Game in Town by Frank Gilroy with Barry Nelson and Tammy Grimes
- Plaza Suite by Neil Simon, starring George C. Scott and Maureen Stapleton, directed by Mike Nichols
- Portrait of a Queen
- The Price by Arthur Miller, directed by Ulu Grosbard
- The Prime of Miss Jean Brodie, starring Zoe Caldwell
- The Promise starring Ian McKellen, Ian McShane and Eileen Atkins
- Rosencrantz and Guildenstern Are Dead by Tom Stoppard
- The Seven Descents of Myrtle by Tennessee Williams, directed by José Quintero
- Soldiers by Rolf Hochhuth, starring John Colicos
- Something Different, written and directed by Carl Reiner, starring Bob Dishy
- Song of the Grasshopper by Alfonso Paso, starring Alfred Drake
- Spofford by Herman Shumlin, starring Melvyn Douglas
- Staircase by Charles Dyer, starring Eli Wallach and Milo O'Shea
- Scuba Duba by Bruce Jay Friedman
- There's a Girl in My Soup by Terence Frisby starring Gig Young
- The Trial of Lee Harvey Oswald, starring Peter Masterson
- The Unknown Soldier and His Wife by Peter Ustinov, directed by John Dexter with Christopher Walken
- Weekend by Gore Vidal
- What Did We Do Wrong? by Henry Denker with Paul Ford

There are also chapters on the actor Peter Masterson, critics (especially Clive Barnes), ticketing, corruption, women's "theatre party" groups, Jewish theatergoers, and homosexuality in the theatre.

== Background ==
William Goldman decided to write the book after making a large amount of money on the sale of his script for Butch Cassidy and the Sundance Kid in the late 1960s. He wanted to attempt a non-fiction work and originally intended to do a piece on mental institutions, such as Meninger's, but was worried about what would happen if the institutions did not co-operate. He then decided to do an article on Broadway because he knew there always would be someone who would talk to him. Goldman:

For the original article, I wanted to interview everybody who was involved with a show in an important position, before and after. But I realized very early on that all failures have the same song. It's always a case of people not communicating, people not understanding, people lying. It's always the same wail, and I realized that my premise was not valid. But by this time, I was into it. It became obsessive, and it evolved into whatever The Season is. The Season I enjoyed writing. I don't like writing very much. But doing The Season was social.

Goldman said he intended to interview Clive Barnes "but by the time I realized how horrendous he was I couldn't bear to call him up." He later said "I never intended to devote a year and a half of my life" to the book "and I'd never do it again."

== Reception ==
The book received mixed reviews, The Chicago Tribune calling it "entertaining" and the Wall Street Journal "uneven".

Walter Kerr, who was criticized and praised in The Season, called it "a good book; crabby, opinionated, honest in its jaundice, loving in its bitterness, well-researched, exasperated, swift and itchy". However, he later disagreed with Goldman's contention that all critics' darlings were women.

Harold Clurman, who also featured in the book, said it performed "a hatchet job on Broadway... though I agree with a good number of Goldman's statements... I do not find this book, in any serious or truly helpful sense, illuminating." He also complained about Goldman's treatment of critics.

Christopher Lehmann Haupt of the New York Times called the book a "loose-limbed, insidey, savvy, nuts and bolts report" but complained about Goldman's suggestions to improve theatre and his criticisms of critics.

Clive Barnes, who was heavily criticised in The Season, later said "I haven't read the book but I've been told that in some ways it's rather good but that the guy's a Philistine. He doesn't like Pinter and he doesn't like Hair. If he doesn't like Pinter, I guess I'd rather he not like me either."

Goldman later said that he:

Was determined to write as honest a book as I could. It was a year and a half of my life and a lot of people still won't speak to me because of that book and it really shocked me. I was so shocked by people's responses I stopped going to the theatre. For about five years I didn't go at all. I had hoped that somebody would say 'Well, at least it's down now. This is what Broadway is like at this point in time.' And it was, for the most part, atrociously reviewed...and so many people hated it and hated me for writing it...I mean there were actresses who would say 'If I ever see him, I would hit him.' Things like that. There was a wild reaction to it.
