= Eleanor D. Wilson =

American actress (1908–2002)

- Born: Eleanor Delaney Wilson; September 9, 1908; Chester, Pennsylvania, U.S.
- Died: May 31, 2002 (aged 93); Williamstown, Massachusetts, U.S.
- Education: Hollins College
- Occupations: Actress, artist

Eleanor Delaney Wilson (September 9, 1908 – May 31, 2002) was an American Tony-nominated actress and artist, known for her roles in Reds (1981) and the Gore Vidal play Weekend (1968).

== Early years ==
Wilson was born on September 9, 1908, in Chester, Pennsylvania. Her parents were Benny Y. Wilson and Florence Wetherill Wilson. After attending Mary Lyon School in Swarthmore, she graduated from Hollins College with a degree in chemistry and went on to become an actress and artist.

== Career ==
Wilson's initial professional acting experience came with director Jasper Deeter at the Hedgerow Theatre. She went on to perform at the Alley Theatre in Houston, the Arena Theatre in Washington, D. C., and the Milwaukee Repertory Theatre.

Her Broadway roles include Weekend (1968), The Wayward Saint (1955), The Silver Whistle (1948), and The Eagle Has Two Heads (1947). Her film roles include Alice's Restaurant (1969) and Reds (1981). She retired from acting in 1984 and then focused on creating mathematical abstract paintings.

Wilson was a member of Actors Equity's union council. During World War II, she toured with the USO.

Wilson studied painting with Raphael Soyer at the New School and with Margaret Stark at the Museum of Modern Art. Her works of art have been displayed at the Hudson Guild and Touchstone Gallery in New York City, Hollins University, Southwestern Vermont Medical Center, Widener University, and Williams College Museum of Art.

== Death ==
Wilson died at her home in Williamstown, Massachusetts, of lung cancer on May 31, 2002.

== Legacy ==
- Wilson was nominated for a Tony Award for Best Featured Actress in a Play for her role as Mrs. Andrews in Weekend.
- Wilson created and provided financial support for the Eleanor D. Wilson museum at her alma mater, Hollins University.
- Wilson's estate provided a $100,000 gift to the Contemporary Artists Center in North Adams, Massachusetts.

== Filmography ==
| Year | Title | Role | Notes |
|---|---|---|---|
| 1969 | Alice's Restaurant | Landlady | |
| 1981 | Reds | Mrs. Reed | as John Reed's mother |
