= Got tu Go Disco =

1979 musical

- Music: Kenny Lehman; John Davis; Ray Chew; Nat Adderley Jr.; Thomas Jones; Wayne Morrison; Steve Boston; Eugene Narmore; Betty Rowland; Jerry Powell
- Lyrics: Kenny Lehman; John Davis; Ray Chew; Nat Adderley Jr.; Thomas Jones; Wayne Morrison; Steve Boston; Eugene Narmore; Betty Rowland; Jerry Powell
- Book: John Zodrow
- Productions: 1979 Minskoff Theatre, NYC

Got tu Go Disco is a musical with music and lyrics by Kenny Lehman, John Davis, Ray Chew, Nat Adderley Jr., Thomas Jones, Wayne Morrison, Steve Boston, Eugene Narmore, Betty Rowland, Jerry Powell and a book by John Zodrow. Following nine previews, the show opened on Broadway in June 1979, where it ran for eight performances.

The plot adapts the Cinderella story to a nightclub setting, as the young woman Cassette sells clothes by day and becomes queen of the dancefloor by night.

== History ==
Got tu Go Disco was the brainchild of promoter and producer Jerry Brandt, who had opened several popular nightclubs and managed musical acts such as Jobriath and Carly Simon. In a New York Times article in 1979, Brandt said, "You don't have to be a genius to know this is the coming thing ... And do you know what excites me the most about this? There will be so much happening, the audience will never know what's coming next." Brandt had a reputation for thinking big and not worrying about the details, and the result – as Steven Gaines put it in a New York magazine article about the show – was a production that included "an inexperienced staff, two unknown stars, the real-life doorman and bartender of Studio 54, two directors, three scriptwriters, three choreographers, eleven composers, a cast of 36, and a $500,000 set with a dance floor that fills with 3000 gallons of water and jackknifes toward the audience." One of those unknown stars was Irene Cara, one year before she made a splash in the movie Fame.

The reviews for the show were withering. Clive Barnes in the New York Post called it "memorably unmemorable"; Douglas Watt in the Daily News wrote that it was "pure trash"; and Richard Eder summed it up in The New York Times as "not for a theater audience."

== Songs ==
Act I

- "Puttin' It On" - Ensemble
- "Disco Shuffle" - Billy and Cassette
- "All I Need" - Cassette
- "It Won't Work" - Vitus
- "Trust Me" – Cubby and Contact
- "In and Out" – Marc and Company
- "Pleasure Pusher" - Ensemble
- "If That Didn't Do It, It Can't Be Done" - Company

Act II

- "Inter-Mish-Un" - Billy Newton-Davis
- "Hanging Over and Out" - Vitus
- "Chic to Cheap" – Snap-Flash
- "Bad, Glad, Good and Had" - Cassette
- "Cassie" - Billy
- "Takin' the Light" - Cassette, Billy and Ensemble
- "Gettin' to the Top" - Antwerp
- "Dance Forever" - Entire Company
- "Got tu Go Disco" - Entire Company
