= Derek Waring =

British actor (1927–2007)

- Publicity photo c. 1983
- Born: Derek Barton-Chapple; 26 April 1927; Mill Hill, London, England
- Died: 20 February 2007 (aged 79); Petworth, West Sussex, England
- Occupation: Actor
- Spouse: Dorothy Tutin (m. 1963; died 2001)
- Children: 2

Derek Waring (born Derek Barton-Chapple; 26 April 1927 – 20 February 2007) was an English actor who is best remembered for playing Detective Inspector Goss in Z-Cars from 1969 to 1973. He was married to the actress Dame Dorothy Tutin.

== Early life ==
Waring was born in Mill Hill, London in 1927; his father was the TV pioneer Wing Commander H.J. Barton-Chapple, who had worked with John Logie Baird. Waring's brother Richard was a television comedy scriptwriter. After attending Dulwich College, Waring served with the army in Berlin. He later turned down the offer of a place at St Edmund Hall, Oxford to take up a scholarship with the Royal Academy of Dramatic Art and then went into rep theatre.

Waring's first television role was in a 1956 episode of The Jack Benny Programme. After that he appeared in many television programmes in small roles, including The Adventures of Sir Lancelot, The Adventures of Robin Hood, Ivanhoe, Dixon of Dock Green, Ghost Squad and Callan. He played Louis in episode 28 of The Adventures of William Tell, "The Avenger" (1959). In 1964, Waring married Dorothy Tutin; the couple had two children, Amanda and Nick, both of whom later became actors.

== Television success ==
In 1969, Waring started playing DI Neil Goss in the police drama Z-Cars and continued in this role for 215 episodes until 1973. Following Z-Cars he played Roland Moody in Moody and Pegg. Later in the 1970s, Waring appeared in programmes such as Murder Most English, Crown Court, The New Avengers, Two's Company and George and Mildred. In 1987, he played Harry Somers in the Scottish soap opera Take the High Road. During the 1980s he appeared on-screen in The Enigma Files, Never the Twain and The Professionals. In 1982, he appeared as Shardovan in the third and fourth parts of the Doctor Who serial "Castrovalva" .

Waring was a member of the Royal Shakespeare Company and appeared in many productions including War of the Roses. In the West End he appeared in Cowardy Custard, Suzie Wong and in the late 1980s The Boy Friend, which was his final West End appearance. On Broadway he played Prince Albert in Portrait of a Queen opposite his wife who played Queen Victoria.

== Later life ==
In 1987, Waring appeared in the film Indian Summer. His last television role was playing Mr. Cooper-Bassett in a 1995 episode of Keeping Up Appearances. He had married the actress Dorothy Tutin at the end of 1963. The couple's two children were born in 1964 and 1966. After his wife's death in 2001, Waring concentrated on radio work. Waring died from cancer at Petworth Cottage Hospital in West Sussex in 2007, aged 79.
