= Leda Had a Little Swan =

- Original language: English
- Written by: Bamber Gascoigne
- Genre: Comedy
- Setting: London

Premiere
- Date: 29 March 1968 (preview), never officially opened
- Place: Cort Theatre, 138 W. 48th St., New York, US

Leda Had a Little Swan is a 1968 play written by Bamber Gascoigne. It never officially opened. The work, which included references to bestiality, and sexual relations between parents and their children, did not received a licence to perform in London. However, Broadway producer Claire Nichtern took up the play for staging at the Cort Theatre, New York, under the direction of André Gregory. The cast included Severn Darden, Michael J. Pollard, Joan Darling, Fred Stewart, John Pleshette, Paul Benedict, Seth Allen, and Maxine Green. Nichtern cancelled the production on the day before opening, after fourteen previews.

The play was pilloried in the William Goldman book The Season: A Candid Look at Broadway, which described "spluttering outrage ... and scuffles in the lobby" during its short run of public previews.

== Playtext ==
The play was never published, but the New York Public Library holds a copy of the working playtext.
