= A Touch of the Poet =

Play by Eugene O'Neill

Poster for the 2005 Broadway revival with Gabriel Byrne

A Touch of the Poet is a play by Eugene O'Neill completed in 1942 but not performed until 1958, after his death.

It and its sequel, More Stately Mansions, were intended to be part of a nine-play cycle entitled A Tale of Possessors Self-Dispossessed. Set in the dining room of Melody's Tavern, located in a village a few miles from Boston, it centers on ageing pub owner Major Cornelius ("Con") Melody, a braggart, social climber, and victim of the American class system in 1828 Massachusetts.

The play has been produced on Broadway four times. The original production, directed by Harold Clurman, opened on October 2, 1958, at the Helen Hayes Theatre (at the time, called The Little Theatre), where it ran for 284 performances. The cast included Helen Hayes, Eric Portman, Betty Field, and Kim Stanley. Both the play and Stanley earned Tony Award nominations.

== Productions ==
The first revival, directed by Jack Sydow, played in repertory with The Imaginary Invalid and Tonight at 8.30 at the ANTA Playhouse in 1967.

Ten years later, the second revival, directed by José Quintero, opened on December 28, 1977, again at the Helen Hayes Theatre, where it ran for 141 performances. The cast included Geraldine Fitzgerald, Milo O'Shea, Kathryn Walker, and Jason Robards, who was Tony-nominated for Best Actor in Play.

After 32 previews, the third revival, directed by Doug Hughes, opened on December 8, 2005, at Studio 54, where it ran for 50 performances. Gabriel Byrne and Emily Bergl headed the cast.

In 1988, Timothy Dalton and Vanessa Redgrave starred in a production that played at the Young Vic and Comedy Theatres in London. Irish Repertory Theatre's 2022 off-Broadway production starred Robert Cuccioli as Con; Ciarán O'Reilly directed.

== Reception ==
Richard Eder of The New York Times wrote after seeing the 1977 revival that A Touch of the Poet "is not one of [O'Neill's] greatest plays but it has greatness in it. It is a difficult greatness to pry out fully in performance. This play about the tearing-away of a tavern keeper's monstrous illusion about himself has pain, humor and even grandeur. Much of this comes from the language, which has rarely run so clear and uncluttered in O'Neill, even if there is too much of it. It is the dramatic structure that is sometimes cluttered, unsure, even absent-minded."

== Awards and nominations ==
=== Original Broadway production ===
Year	Award	Category	Nominee	Result
1959	Tony Award	Best Play		Nominated
1959	Tony Award	Best Actress in a Play	Kim Stanley	Nominated

=== 1977 Broadway revival ===
Year	Award	Category	Nominee	Result
1978	Tony Award	Best Most Innovative Production of a Revival		Nominated
1978	Tony Award	Best Actor in a Play	Jason Robards	Nominated

=== 2005 Broadway revival ===
Year	Award	Category	Nominee	Result
2006	Tony Award	Best Costume Design of a Play	Santo Loquasto	Nominated
