= The Promise (1965 play) =

The Promise is a play written in 1965 by Russian playwright Aleksei Arbuzov. The story follows a young woman and two young men from their first meeting in a derelict room during the Siege of Leningrad in World War II; through the woman's marriage to one of the men, who turns out to be the "wrong" one; then finally to a new start with the "right" one.

Ariadne Nicolaeff's English translation of the play was produced in London in 1967, with a cast including Judi Dench, Ian McKellen and Ian McShane. A British reviewer called the play "Charmingly old-fashioned and chastely sentimental, [yet it] gave a lot of pleasure." This same production, with Eileen Atkins replacing Dench, opened on November 14, 1967, at Henry Miller's Theater in New York; it ran for 23 performances.

The play was profiled in the William Goldman book The Season: A Candid Look at Broadway.

A newspaper ad for the Broadway run can be seen in the final scene of the tenth episode of the second season of the show That Girl. The episode ("When in Rome") aired November 9, 1967, just under a week before the production opened.
