= You Know I Can't Hear You When the Water's Running =

Play written by Robert Anderson

- Broadway production poster
- Original language: English
- Written by: Robert Anderson
- Genre: Comedy

Premiere
- Date: March 13, 1967
- Place: Ambassador Theatre; New York City

You Know I Can't Hear You When the Water's Running is a collection of four unrelated one-act comedy plays by Robert Anderson.

== Synopsis ==
=== Plot ===
In The Shock of Recognition, playwright Jack Barnstable auditions Richard Pawling for a role that requires nudity and discovers the overeager actor is more than willing to show his stuff. The Footsteps of Doves focuses on Harriet and George, a married couple shopping for twin beds after many years of marriage. George, who is opposed to the change, strikes up a conversation with Jill, a considerably younger fellow shopper who shares his view. In I'll Be Home for Christmas, Chuck and Edith realize how empty their marriage has become as they await the arrival of their adult children. I'm Herbert is a scattered conversation between Herbert and Muriel, an elderly couple with memory problems who try in vain to recall their earlier relationships.

After 15 previews, the original Broadway production opened on March 13, 1967, at the Ambassador Theatre. It transferred twice, to the Broadhurst Theatre and then the Lunt-Fontanne Theatre, before it completed its run of 756 performances on January 4, 1969.

Directed by Alan Schneider, the opening night cast included Eileen Heckart, Martin Balsam, George Grizzard, and Melinda Dillon. Replacements later in the run included Larry Blyden, Irene Dailey, and William Redfield.

Costume design was by Theoni V. Aldredge and lighting design was by Jules Fisher.

Balsam won the Tony Award for Best Performance by a Leading Actor in a Play. Schneider was nominated for the Tony Award for Best Direction of a Play but lost to Mike Nichols for Plaza Suite.

== Productions ==
=== Original Production ===
First presented by Jack Farren and Gilbert Cates at the Ambassador Theatre in New York City on March 13, 1967, with the following cast:

The Shock of Recognition

- Jack Barnstable .... Joe Silver
- Herb Miller .... George Grizzard
- Richard Pawling .... Martin Balsam
- Dorothy .... Melinda Dillon

The Footsteps of Doves

- Salesman .... George Grizzard
- Harriet .... Eileen Heckart
- George .... Martin Balsam
- Jill .... Melinda Dillon

I'll be Home for Christmas

- Chuck .... Martin Balsam
- Edith .... Eileen Heckart
- Clarice .... Melinda Dillon

I'm Herbert

- Herbert .... George Grizzard
- Muriel ....Eileen Heckart

This production was directed by Alan Schneider, with scenery designed by Ed Wittstein, costumes by Theoni V. Aldredge, and lighting by Jules Fisher

=== Other Productions ===
==== Agentura Harlekýn ====
- From Prague's theatre of Agency Harlekýn. Directed by Pavel Háša.

Poznání šokem (The Shock of Recognition)

- Herb Miller .... Petr Nárožný
- Jack Barnstable .... Jiří Ptáčník
- Richard Pawling .... Václav Vydra
- Dorothy .... Dana Morávková or Eva Janoušková

Stopy Holubic (The Footsteps of Doves)

- Harriet .... Libuše Švormová
- George .... Jiří Ptáčník
- Jill .... Dana Morávková or Eva Janoušková
- Shopassistant .... Václav Vydra

Já jsem Herbert (I'm Herbert)

- Herbert .... Petr Nárožný
- Muriel .... Květa Fialová

== Career launches ==
The creators of the soon-to-debut The Mary Tyler Moore Show were having challenges finding the right actor for the role of anchorman Ted Baxter. A Mary Tyler Moore Show producer happened to see Ted Knight perform in You Know I Can't Hear You When The Water's Running at the Gallery Theater in California. Based on his performance, Knight was brought in to audition for, and was eventually cast as, Ted Baxter.
