= Johnny No-Trump =

1967 play by Mary Mercier

- Original language: English
- Written by: Mary Mercier
- Genre: drama
- Setting: February, the present. The Armstrong home on Long Island.

Premiere
- Date: October 8, 1967
- Place: Cort Theatre, New York
- Directed by: Joseph Hardy

Johnny No-Trump is a 1967 play written by Mary Mercier which ran for one performance on Broadway.

The play has been discussed in several books, including Shoptalk: Conversations About Theater and Film With Twelve Writers by Dennis Brown (1993); Broadway's Beautiful Losers by Marilyn Stasio (1972); On Stage: The Making of a Broadway Play by Susan Jacobs (1967); and The Season by William Goldman (1969). In the latter Goldman calls Johnny No-Trump "The best new American play of the season".

== Productions ==
Johnny No-Trump opened at the Cort Theatre on October 8, 1967, and ran for 5 previews and one regular performance. Directed by Joseph Hardy, it starred James Broderick, Sada Thompson, Pat Hingle, Don Scardino and, making her Broadway debut, Bernadette Peters.

Johnny No Trump was revived by the Equity Library Theater (New York) in 1970, The Cleveland Play House in 1972, and Iglesia's Theater Club (New York) in 1975.

== Synopsis ==
Johnny, a teen-aged young man, tries to come to terms with himself and his family. He wants to leave school to be a poet, to the dismay of his schoolteacher mother. The play takes place in February 1965, in a small Long Island, New York town. The characters consist of 16-year-old Johnny Edwards; Florence Edwards, his mother; Alexander Edwards, her estranged husband; Harry Armstrong, Johnny's uncle; and Bettina, a "very grown-up" 15-year-old neighbor.

== Reception ==
William Goldman, writing about the play in The Season. said "A serious drama needs every conceivable break to survive. Johnny No-Trump had nothing whatsoever going for it: a new writer, a director new to Broadway, a cast without box-office appeal. It got, on the whole, mixed notices. It needed raves. It closed."

In his review in The New York Times, critic Clive Barnes wrote: "There are times when the characters...seem to be talking with absolute truthfulness...within seconds the play... is offering slick gibberish."

Barnes wrote after it closed "...I regret [it] was abruptly taken off by its producer before it had a chance to get a word-of-mouth resuscitation."

Walter Kerr, also in The New York Times, wrote that Mercier "is plainly talented, she is already capable of a blunt and crackling speech that insists upon being listened to. ... To compound the disaster, the production was superior at every level: director Joseph Hardy displayed a fresh sensibilty that coaxed an altogether unfamiliar reality – at once supple and hardheaded – out of a familiar kind of domestic crisis. ... There was ample treasure worth finding."

One of the producers, Richard Barr, in announcing the closing, stated: "The fact that the critics did not appreciate that this play was so far above the level...of almost any American play for the past few seasons indicates to me that there is a great struggle ahead for sensitive, intelligent, talented playwrights."

Goldman was an admirer of Mercier's work in the play saying "There’s a rhythm to her work, a build to her sentences. She possesses a marvelous flair for invective... she puts people up there, weary, vulnerable people. Her play is in the tradition of “family” plays, and it is lovely.... that extraordinary writing skill of hers makes up for any plot deficiences."

William Goldman later argued that the play struggled because it arrived in New York "so quietly":

It had no power connected with it. Sada Thompson was not then Sada Thompson. And Pat Hingle was what he always is, which is a good, solid actor, but he doesn't sell tickets like Rosalind Russell. So the critics were allowed to pick at it. The same play, word for word, wouldn't have been any better done if it had come in as a David Merrick production, with Elia Kazan directing, and a star. But it's my contention that if the play had come in with power, then people would have overlooked any flaws, because those who saw it were so moved by it.

Pat Hingle, who appeared in the play, argued the producers "panicked" by taking it off stage after one performance. "We did capacity business in previews... If you go back and check, you’ll discover that Johnny No-Trump got much better reviews than The Price. But this time we had Arthur Miller's name. Nobody panicked, and The Price ran for more than a year. When I think back on the whole Johnny No-Trump experience, it’s one of the saddest things that ever happened to a play.”
