= Fred Stewart (actor) =

American actor and director

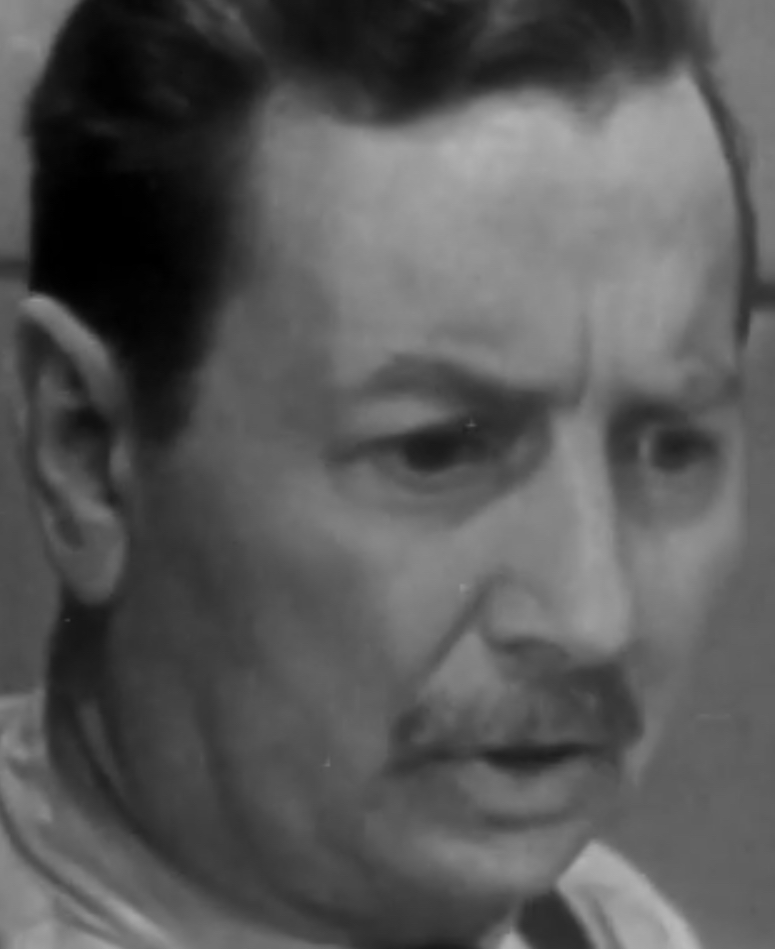
- Stewart in an episode of Tales of Tomorrow (1952)
- Born: December 7, 1906; Atlanta, Georgia, U.S.
- Died: December 5, 1970 (aged 63); New York City, U.S.
- Occupation: Actor
- Years active: 1924–1971

Fred Stewart (December 7, 1906 – December 5, 1970) was an American actor and director who appeared on stage, film, and television.

== Biography ==
Stewart was born in Atlanta, Georgia and attended Oglethorpe University. As a young man, he operated the Playmakers Theatre in Atlanta from 1924 to 1927, and then made his stage debut with a company playing Huntington, West Virginia. He made his Broadway debut in 1931 in Ladies of Creation at the Cort Theatre, the start of a lengthy Broadway career including plays such as Brigadoon (1950 production) The Crucible (1953, original cast) and Cat on a Hot Tin Roof (1955, original cast), and through More Stately Mansions (1967–68), a play by Eugene O'Neill.

Stewart also debuted in movies in 1931, with film appearances including in Splendor in the Grass (1961) and In the Heat of the Night (1967). He also debuted on television in 1939. He was playing a role on the soap opera Love of Life at the time of his death. Stewart was a founding member of the Actors Studio, where he died in New York, on December 5, 1970, just two days before his 64th birthday.
