= Bob Dishy =

American actor

- Born: Brooklyn, New York, U.S.
- Occupation: Actor
- Years active: 1955–2014; 2025
- Spouse: Judy Graubart (m. 1986)
- Children: 2

Bob Dishy is an American actor of stage, film, and television.

== Biography ==
=== Early life and education ===
Dishy grew up in the Bensonhurst section of Brooklyn. His father, a salesman, was born in Beirut and his mother in Jerusalem. He is of Sephardic Jewish origin.

Dishy first became interested in acting while in fifth grade, when he performed in a student play. After graduating from New Utrecht High School, he majored in drama at Syracuse University, graduating in 1955.

While at Syracuse he performed in student musical productions. He also performed at resorts that maintained resident summer theater companies, Green Mansions in New York and Tamiment in Pennsylvania, that put on new revues every week. He worked alongside Carol Burnett, Woody Allen and Sheldon Harnick.

Upon graduation from Syracuse he was cast as a baseball player in Damn Yankees. His acting career was interrupted by service in the U.S. Army in the late 1950s, during which he toured military bases in a show called Rolling Along in '57 after winning an All-Army Entertainment Contest.

=== Career ===
Dishy played Sergeant John J. Wilson, Columbo's polite, respectful assistant in two episodes of Columbo ("Now You See Him" and "The Greenhouse Jungle"); Rose’s titular love interest “Mister Terrific” in an episode of The Golden Girls; and Dr. Schenkman, the marriage counselor for Niles and Maris, in an episode of Frasier. He also appeared in several episodes of Law & Order.

His film appearances include Lovers and Other Strangers (1970), I Wonder Who's Killing Her Now? (1975), The Big Bus (1976), The Last Married Couple in America (1980), First Family (1980), Author! Author! (1982), Brighton Beach Memoirs (1986), Critical Condition (1987), Stay Tuned (1992), Used People (1992), Don Juan DeMarco (1994), Jungle 2 Jungle (1997) and Along Came Polly (2004).

He was a regular on the American version of That Was The Week That Was, a weekly satirical series that aired on NBC-TV in 1964–65.

He made his stage debut as a replacement for the ballplayer Rocky in the original run of the hit musical Damn Yankees: a role he reprised ten years later for the TV adaptation. In 1965 Dishy co-starred with Liza Minnelli in the Broadway musical, "Flora, The Red Menace" directed by George Abbott.

== Selected appearances ==
Year	Title
1955	Damn Yankees
1960	From A to Z
1965	Flora the Red Menace
1967	The Unknown Soldier and His Wife
1967	Something Different
1968	The Goodbye People
1969	A Way of Life
1971	The Mary Tyler Moore Show
1971	That Girl
1972	The Creation of the World and Other Business
1972	All in the Family
1972	Columbo, episode "The Greenhouse Jungle"
1974	An American Millionaire
1976	Sly Fox
1976	Columbo, episode "Now You See Him"
1978	Alice
1979	Murder at the Howard Johnson's
1980	Barney Miller
1981	Grownups
1986	Brighton Beach Memoirs
1987	Critical Condition
1988	The Golden Girls
1989	Cafe Crown
1989	The Tenth Man
1993	My Boyfriend's Back
1994	Thicker Than Blood: The Larry McLinden Story
1994	Don Juan DeMarco
1998	A Fish in the Bathtub
1998	Frasier
1999	The Price
2002	Morning's at Seven
2004	Along Came Polly
2004	Sly Fox
2014	The Angriest Man in Brooklyn
2025	Étoile
