= Mike Downstairs =

- Written by: George Panetta
- Original language: English
- Genre: comedy
- Setting: Little Italy, Manhattan

Premiere
- Date premiered: 18 April 1968
- Place premiered: Hudson Theatre, New York City

Mike Downstairs is a 1968 American play. It was poorly reviewed and had a short run on its Broadway debut despite starring Dane Clark.

The play was also profiled in the William Goldman book The Season: A Candid Look at Broadway. Goldman called it the best of the plays that came out in April of its year. He summaried it as " a Spinoza-spouting Italian gets upset when the Authorities insist on holding an air-raid drill in preparation for when the Bomb drops, and he is beaten or killed and dragged off stage while all his friends roll around on the floor as the curtain comes down. (The play was a comedy.)"
