= A Day in the Death of Joe Egg =

1967 play

- 2001 West End revival theatrical poster
- Written by: Peter Nichols
- Original language: English
- Subject: Parents with a child with cerebral palsy use humour to cope
- Genre: Comedy
- Setting: Present day, Bristol, England

Premiere
- Date premiered: 1967
- Place premiered: Citizens Theatre; Glasgow, Scotland

A Day in the Death of Joe Egg is a 1967 play by the English playwright Peter Nichols, first staged at the Citizens Theatre in Glasgow, Scotland, before transferring to the Comedy Theatre in London's West End.

== Synopsis ==
The play centres on a British couple, Bri and Sheila, who are struggling to save their marriage whilst trying to raise their only child, a small girl named Josephine, who has cerebral palsy. She uses a wheelchair and is nonverbal, which her parents see as unable to communicate. Caring for her has occupied nearly every moment of her parents' lives since her birth, taking a heavy toll on their marriage. Sheila gives Josephine as much of a life as she can, while Bri wants the child institutionalised and has begun to entertain chilling fantasies of killing himself and Josephine.

== Characters ==
- Bri
- Grace
- Joe
- Freddie
- Pam
- Sheila

== Productions ==
After its premiere in Glasgow in 1967, A Day in the Death of Joe Egg opened in London's West End in 1967 then transferred to Broadway the next year. On Broadway, the play received four nominations for Tony Awards, including Best Play, Best Actor (Albert Finney), Best Featured Actress (Zena Walker) and Best Director (Michael Blakemore). Walker won the Tony for Best Featured Actress. The play was profiled in the William Goldman book The Season: A Candid Look at Broadway.

The Brunton Theatre Company, Musselburgh, produced the play under the direction of Sandy Neilson during its first season in 1979.

The play has been revived twice on Broadway. A 1985 revival staged at the Longacre Theatre ran for 93 performances. It was directed by Arvin Brown and the cast included Jim Dale, Stockard Channing, Joanna Gleason, Christina Pickles and Kate Wilkinson. The production won the Drama Desk Award for Outstanding Revival.

A revival in the West End opened in October 2001 at the New Ambassadors Theatre, starring Clive Owen and Victoria Hamilton and was directed by Laurence Boswell. This production transferred to the Comedy Theatre in December 2001, with Eddie Izzard replacing Owen. The same production opened on Broadway, produced by Roundabout Theatre, in March 2003 at the American Airlines Theatre and played for 69 performances. Directed by Lawrence Boswell, the play starred Eddie Izzard and Victoria Hamilton.

In October 2011 the Citizens Theatre again staged the play that premiered there in 1967, with a cast that included Miles Jupp, Sarah Tansey, and Miriam Margolyes.

In May 2013 it received an off-off-Broadway production from Retro Productions in New York City.

In September 2019, the play had a West End revival at Trafalgar Studios, starring Claire Skinner and Toby Stephens, directed by Simon Evans.

== Film adaptations ==
Nichols adapted A Day in the Death of Joe Egg for two films, first in 1970, and again in 2002. The 1970 adaptation, which was not released until 1972, was directed by Peter Medak, starring Alan Bates, Janet Suzman, Joan Hickson, Peter Bowles and Elizabeth Robillard. A 2002 television version was directed by Robin Lough, with stars Eddie Izzard, Victoria Hamilton, Prunella Scales, and Robin Weaver.

== Awards and nominations ==
Awards

- 1985 Drama Desk Award for Outstanding Revival
- 1985 Outer Critics Circle Award for Best Revival
- 1985 Tony Award for Best Revival of a Play

Nominations

- 1968 Tony Award for Best Play
- 2003 Tony Award for Best Revival of a Play
- 2003 Drama Desk Award for Outstanding Revival of a Play
