= Daphne in Cottage D =

1967 play by Stephen Levi

- Original language: English
- Written by: Stephen Levi
- Characters: Daphne; Joseph
- Genre: drama
- Setting: Living room of a resort on the New England coast

Premiere
- Date: October 15, 1967
- Place: Longacre Theatre, New York
- Directed by: Martin Fried

Daphne in Cottage D is a 1967 play written by Stephen Levi. The play premiered on Broadway on October 15, 1967 after previews from October 9, 1967, and closed on November 18, 1967 after 41 performances, losing over $100,000. The play starred Sandy Dennis and William Daniels, and was directed by Martin Fried.

== History ==
Dennis had worked with Daniels before on A Thousand Clowns and she asked him to appear in this production. Daniels accepted, having never played a lead role before. The play was produced by Dennis' business manager and directed by a friend of hers.

William Daniels called the production a "nightmare", writing in his memoirs "I don’t remember much about the rehearsal period except the realization that the director, an old friend of Sandy’s and mine, Marty Fried, was not going to be much help in staging the play. The play also needed a third act, and we didn’t have one that worked by the time we got to out-of-town tryouts." He added "Sandy’s performances there were met with silence and unease. You could sense that she and the role she was playing were turning off the audience, and that sent her into a panic."

Daniels said there were "endless rewrites" which Dennis said came from a play doctor but which he was later told were actually from her. Her changes including moving around a monologue of Daniels which was very successful. He claims she resorted to "bad habits she had exhibited in" in the past "the repetitions, the ad-libbing, the hemming and hawing, the snifflings, the crying, and so on. In her frustration and anger with the situation she decided one night to try and humiliate me in a scene." Daniels tried to leave the production but was threatened with a lawsuit if he did. However he was then cast in 1776 which was a huge success.

The play's troubled production was profiled in a chapter in the William Goldman book The Season: A Candid Look at Broadway called 'Critics' Darling'. Goldman argues the play was destroyed by Dennis' behaviour. The daily newspapers gave Dennis strong personal reviews which he felt misrepresented what Dennis was actually doing on stage:

That is a provable statement: if a performer of Dennis' magnitude appeared on the Broadway stage in a play in which she was "adorable," "brilliant" and "memorable," the show is simply not going to close after 41 performances. This is a girl who was on the cover of Time magazine a month before the show opened. This is a girl whose last Broadway performance was one of the personal triumphs of the decade. If Ingrid Bergman can run a stiff like More Stately Mansions, in which she did not get splendid personal notices, for 150 performances, then Sandy Dennis can run a stiff longer than 41. If she was what the daily papers said.

== Premise ==
Daphne and Joseph meet by accident one day in a resort hotel. She is the alcoholic widow of a movie star and has a seven year old son called Bill who lives with a guardian. Joseph is a doctor who two years ago ran over and killed his son Billy, who would now be seven.

== Notes ==
- Daniels, William (2017). There I go again : how I came to be Mr. Feeny, John Adams, Dr. Craig, KITT, and many others. U of Nebraska Press. ISBN 978-1-61234-852-0.
