= Sly Fox =

Play written by Larry Gelbart

Sly Fox is a comedic play by Larry Gelbart, based on Ben Jonson's Volpone (The Fox), updating the setting from Renaissance Venice to 19th century San Francisco, and changing the tone from satire to farce.

The play revolves around the character of the very wealthy Foxwell J. Sly, and his indentured servant Simon Able. Sly has the town duped into believing that he is dying, and four citizens vie for his inheritance. Jethro Crouch is willing to will away his son’s inheritance to Sly on the promise that he receives Sly’s money after Sly has died; Abner Truckle solicits his wife to Sly under the impression that it will sway Sly to name him as his heir; Lawyer Craven defends the dignity of Sly in court after the Captain discovers him molesting Mrs. Truckle, for the same promise of riches; Merrilee Fancy, the most popular harlot in the bay town, finds herself in the family way and hopes to marry Sly for his wealth. None of them realize the trick, and even Able, Sly’s closest confidant and student, is unable to outfox the master of deception.

It premiered on Broadway December 14, 1976 at the Broadhurst Theatre. Directed by Arthur Penn, the play featured George C. Scott, Bob Dishy, Hector Elizondo, Jack Gilford, Gretchen Wyler, and Sandra Seacat. Scott was succeeded by Robert Preston.

According to his biography at tcm.com, Jackie Gleason was touring in the lead role of Sly Fox in 1978 when he suffered a heart attack and had to permanently leave the show, undergoing a triple bypass.

The play was revived on April 1, 2004 at the Ethel Barrymore Theatre, again directed by Arthur Penn, featuring Richard Dreyfuss, Bob Dishy, Eric Stoltz, René Auberjonois, Professor Irwin Corey, Elizabeth Berkley, Rachel York, Peter Scolari, and Bronson Pinchot.
