= The Seven Descents of Myrtle =

Play by Tennessee Williams

- First edition
- Original language: English
- Written by: Tennessee Williams
- Based on: Kingdom of Heaven by Tennessee Williams
- Genre: drama

Premiere
- Directed by: Jose Quintero

The Seven Descents of Myrtle is a play in seven scenes by Tennessee Williams. It started as a short story, The Kingdom of Earth, which Williams began in 1942 while in Macon, Georgia, but did not publish until 1954, in the limited edition of his story collection Hard Candy. Williams subsequently adapted the story into a one-act play, "Kingdom of Earth," published in the February 1, 1967, edition of Esquire magazine. He then expanded that play into a full-length seven-scene version, premiered the following year in New York with the title The Seven Descents of Myrtle and published on October 31, 1968, by New Directions as Kingdom of Earth (The Seven Descents of Myrtle). Its title character is reminiscent of another Williams' heroine, Blanche Dubois in A Streetcar Named Desire.

== Plot ==
The serio-comic play focuses on Lot, a tubercular neurotic youth who is an impotent, closeted transvestite overly attached to the memory of his late mother. He has returned to his ancestral home, a decaying house on the edge of a river on the verge of overflowing, with his new bride Myrtle, a sometime prostitute and former showgirl, the sole surviving member of the Five Memphis Hot Shots. She dwells in a fantasy world of romantic illusions, one of which is to nurse Lot back to health so they can consummate their marriage, but soon discovers Lot only wants to use her to steal the deed to the property from his multiracial half-brother Chicken, who has lived on and farmed the property for years.

Once he meets Myrtle, he gets some romantic designs of his own. In the end of the play, Lot reveals himself dressed in a beautiful dress exposing his deepest darkest secret to Myrtle and Chicken before succumbing to tuberculosis and dying. Chicken and Myrtle end up examining Chicken's new property just before the flood waters come.

== Original production ==
The Broadway production was produced by David Merrick and directed by José Quintero. After two previews, it opened on March 27, 1968, at the Ethel Barrymore Theatre and closed after 29 performances. It starred Brian Bedford as Lot, Harry Guardino as Chicken, and Estelle Parsons as Myrtle. She was nominated for the Tony Award for Best Actress in a Play.

The play was profiled in the William Goldman book The Season: A Candid Look at Broadway.

In his memoirs, Tennessee Williams claimed that he wrote the Estelle Parsons role for Maureen Stapleton. The original production was financed with $400,000 from a Hollywood studio. According to Williams, David Merrick wanted to fire Quintero during rehearsals but Williams would not let him. Williams thought Bedford and Parsons were "superb" but acknowledged "we opened disastrously... certain biased reviewers were particularly nasty about the play." Williams noted Walter Kerr "observed that it was a play that contained excellent and funny characterization and that he hoped I'd rewrite it someday. Actually what it needed was cutting and dear José was not the one for that. Humor he has, but it's a delicate humor that exists in a heart full of sorrow."

== Other productions ==
In 1970, the play was adapted to a feature film and released under the title Last of the Mobile Hot Shots (aka "Blood Kin").

A 1975 production in London, at the Greenwood Theatre, starring Marianne Faithfull as Myrtle, was cancelled after just three performances when Faithfull fell ill with peritonitis.

In 1975 Williams wrote he saw "a perfect revival of" the play "in a small, remote house on the Coast. It was cut to its proper length, beautifully cast, and the lady who directed it brought out its bawdy and yet touching style and its strong thematic content."

In 1976, the play had its West Coast premiere at The Pasadena Repertory Theatre located in The Hotel Carver in Pasadena, California. It starred Marie Peckinpah as Myrtle, Duane Waddell as Chicken, and Ed Harris as Lot. It featured a remarkable three story, rain-drenched set by Howard Whalen. The play was presented under Williams' original title "Kingdom of Earth" and ran for approximately 24 weekend performances over three months. It was directed by Gill Dennis, with executive producer Duane Waddell, and produced by Kevin Cloud Brechner.

In 1991, the play was produced in the UK at the Redgrave Theatre, Farnham starring Kit Hollerbach as Myrtle, Stephen Hattersley as Chicken and Marc Warren as Lot in a production directed by Bill Bankes-Jones. Stephen Hattersley won Best Actor 1991 in the TMA Awards for his performance in this production.

In 2011 it was revived at the Print Room in Notting Hill, under its alternative title Kingdom of Earth, directed by Lucy Bailey.

In 2012, Tom Hiddleston did a reading of the short story version for the series Stories Before Bedtime at the Criterion-Theatre in the United Kingdom. This short story is a more erotic version written in the first person from the perspective of Chicken.

== Characters ==
- Myrtle: a sometime prostitute and former showgirl, the sole surviving member of the Five Memphis Hot Shots.
- Lot: a tubercular neurotic youth who is an impotent, closeted transvestite overly attached to the memory of his late mother.
- Chicken: Lot's multiracial half brother who has been the sole person taking care of their house.
