= Everything in the Garden =

- Written by: Edward Albee; Giles Cooper
- Original language: English

Premiere
- Date premiered: 13 March 1962; 1967 (Albee version)

Everything in the Garden is a play by Giles Cooper, first produced by The Royal Shakespeare Company in 1962 in London.

== Original production ==
Everything in the Garden premiered in a Royal Shakespeare Company production at the New Arts Theatre Club, London, on 13 March 1962. Directed by Donald McWhinnie, the cast featured Geraldine McEwan (Jenny Acton), Betty Baskcomb (Leonie Pimosz), Diarmid Cammell (Roger), Brian Badcoe (Stephen), Geoffrey Chater (Tom), Carole Boyer (Beryl), Caroline Blakiston (Laura), Audine Leith (Louise), and Derek Godfrey (Bernard).

John Elsom noted that the play "suffered from having no clear ending.... In a sense, Cooper's vision of mankind was too bleak to achieve surprise, happy or even definite endings."

== American version ==
An American adaptation by Edward Albee, dedicated to the memory of Giles Cooper, premiered on Broadway at the Plymouth Theatre. The play opened on November 16, 1967, in previews and closed on February 10, 1968, after 14 previews and 84 performances. Directed by Peter Glenville, the cast featured Tom Aldredge (Gilbert), Charles Bazter (Perry), Barbara Bel Geddes (Jenny), Barry Nelson (Richard), Beatrice Straight (Mrs. Toothe), and Robert Moore (Jack).

Barry Nelson and Barbara Bel Geddes had appeared together in The Moon is Blue (1951) and Mary, Mary (1961).

The Albee version changes several aspects of the plot, including the names of some characters.

The Broadway version was budgeted at $150,000. Film rights were sold to 20th Century Fox for $300,000. Fox "made a down payment of $3000,000 toward a ceiling price of $750,000."

The play was profiled in the William Goldman book The Season: A Candid Look at Broadway.

== Overview ==
The play takes place in the suburban house of Richard and Jenny, (Albee version) with the garden that is seen through a sunroom. The couple are trying to keep up with their neighbours, but are struggling. They are visited by a madam, and Jenny becomes a part-time prostitute.
