= Before You Go (play) =

Play written by Lawrence Holofcener

- Original language: English
- Written by: Lawrence Holofcener
- Characters: Boy; Girl; Dog
- Subject: romance
- Genre: comedy-drama
- Setting: Greenwich Village apartment

Premiere
- Date: 11 January 1968
- Place: Henry Miller Theatre

Before You Go is a 1968 comedy play by Lawrence Holofcener about the relationship between an actress and a sculptor.

The original Broadway production starred Marian Seldes and Gene Troobnick.

== Premise ==
A sculptor is invited to a room by an actress.

== Critical reception ==
The critic from Time magazine praised the play, saying that :

The two character man-woman play is now a Broadway staple. Lawrence Holofcener's Before You Go ranks with Two for the Seesaw and The Owl and the Pussycat as the best of the genre. Wry, perceptive, honest, sad, funny and tender, it is compassionately discerning about two people who are not quite wise to themselves.

The critic from the New York Times was less enthusiastic but said the play "unwinds pleasantly enough."

== Production history ==
The play only ran for 29 performances. It was profiled in the William Goldman book The Season: A Candid Look at Broadway. Goldman said the play "arrived to mixed notices, aroused no public interest whatsoever (it grossed less in five weeks on Broadway than Fiddler on the Roof does on Saturday), and closed with a loss of $150,000, remarkable for a one-set, two-character play." He felt "Marian Seldes was so touching, so sad, so vulnerable as the homely girl that she made the whole thing true" but believed that, because Seldes was "homely... a tall, gawky graceless thing" that "the laughter in Before You Go, much of it caused by Miss Seldes’ brilliant performance, never came easily or wholeheartedly because it was too true, and because it was true, too painful."

== Other productions ==
The play was produced in London in 1969 starring Toby Robins and Dinsdale Landen.

It was presented in Washington in 1970.
