= By George =

- Written by: Michael Voysey
- Characters: George Bernard Shaw
- Original language: English

Premiere
- Date premiered: 12 October 1967

By George is a 1967 play about George Bernard Shaw based on his writings.

The play was profiled in the William Goldman book The Season: A Candid Look at Broadway.
