= The Trial of Lee Harvey Oswald (play) =

1967 American play

- Written by: Amram Ducovny; Leon Friedman

Premiere
- Date: 5 November 1967

The Trial of Lee Harvey Oswald is a 1967 American play based on a fictionalized trial of John F. Kennedy's assassin.

A troubled production chronicled in William Goldman's 1969 book The Season: A Candid Look at Broadway, the play premiered on Broadway on Sunday, November 5, 1967 and closed after nine performances.

It was the Broadway debut of actor Peter Masterson in the title role, who got good notices, better than that accorded the play as a whole.

Robin Wagner designed the set.
