= Dorothy Tutin =

British actress (1930–2001)

Dame Dorothy Tutin DBE
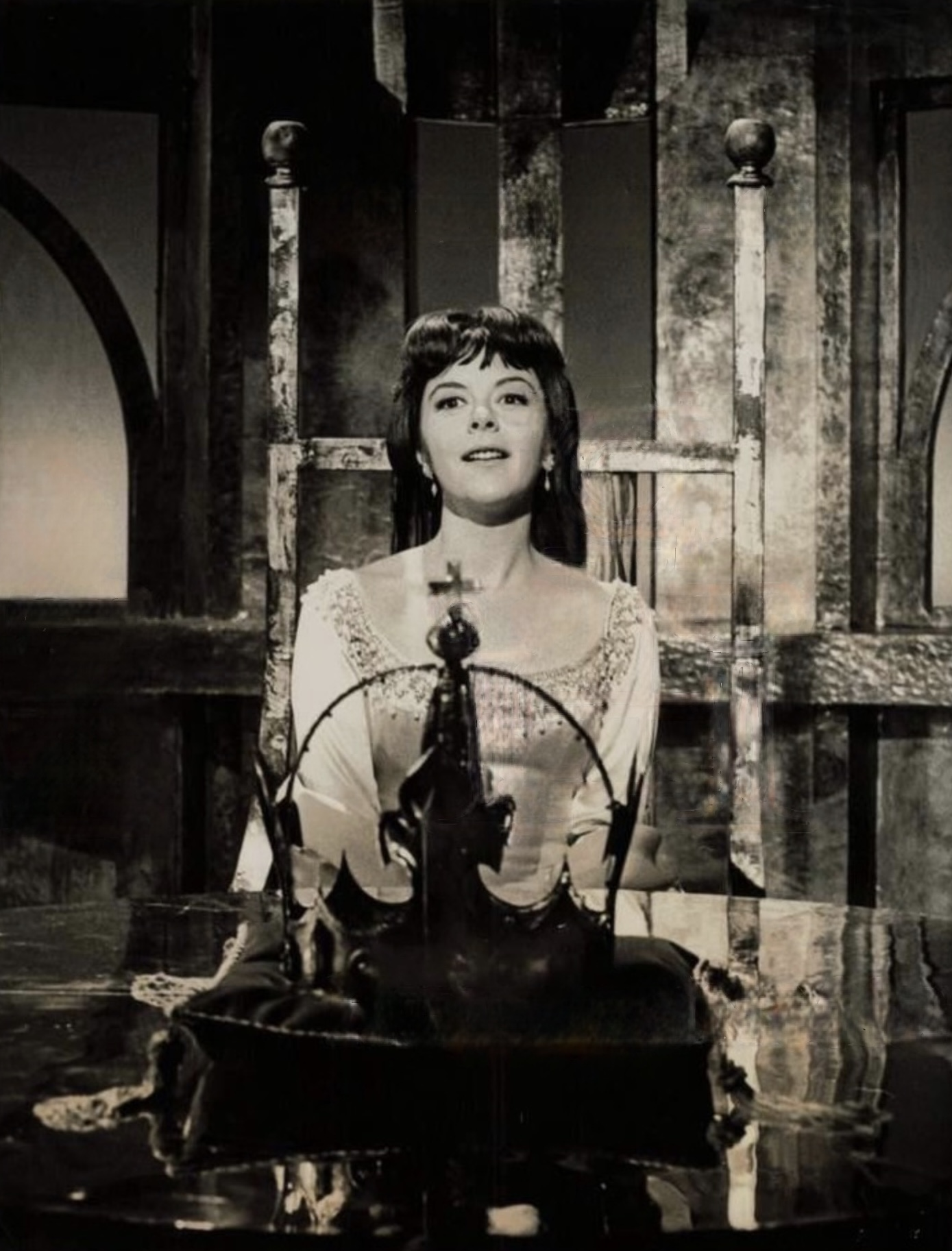
- Tutin in 1965
- Born: 8 April 1930; London, England
- Died: 6 August 2001 (aged 71); Midhurst, West Sussex, England
- Occupation: Actress
- Years active: 1949–1999
- Spouse: Derek Waring (m. 1963)
- Children: 2

Dame Dorothy Tutin (8 April 1930 – 6 August 2001) was an English actress. Renowned for her performances on stage and screen, she received numerous accolades, including two Laurence Olivier Awards and two Standard Theatre Awards, in addition to nominations for two British Academy Film Awards, two British Academy Television Awards, and a Tony Award. She was made a CBE in 1967 and a Dame (DBE) in 2000.

Tutin began her stage career in 1949 and won the 1960 Best Actress Evening Standard Award for Twelfth Night. Having made her Broadway debut in the 1963 production of The Hollow Crown, she received a Tony Award nomination for her role in the 1968 original Broadway production of Portrait of a Queen. In the 1970s, she won a second Best Actress Evening Standard Award and won the Olivier Award (then the Society of London awards) for Best Actress in a Revival for A Month in the Country and The Double Dealer. Her films included The Importance of Being Earnest (1952), The Beggar's Opera (1953), A Tale of Two Cities (1958), Savage Messiah (1972) and The Shooting Party (1985).

An obituary in The Daily Telegraph described her as "one of the most enchanting, accomplished and intelligent leading ladies on the post-war British stage. With her husky voice, deep brown eyes, wistful smile and sense of humour, she brought an enduring charm to all kinds of stage drama, ancient and modern, as well as to films and television plays in a career that spanned more than 40 years".

== Biography ==
Dorothy Tutin was born in London on 8 April 1930, the daughter of John Tutin and Adie Evelyn Fryers, a Yorkshire couple who married the following year.

She was educated at St Catherine's School, Bramley, Surrey and studied for the stage at PARADA and the Royal Academy of Dramatic Art. Tutin was also a talented pianist.

In 1963 she married the actor Derek Waring, and they had two children, Nicholas (born 1966) and Amanda, both of whom became actors (mother and daughter appeared together in the 1989 All Creatures Great and Small episode "Mending Fences"). Dorothy Tutin and Derek Waring remained married until her death in 2001 at the age of 71 from leukaemia. Waring died in 2007, also from cancer.

== Career ==
=== Theatre ===
Dorothy Tutin made her first stage appearance at The Boltons on 6 September 1949, playing Princess Margaret of England in William Douglas-Home's play The Thistle and the Rose.

She joined the Bristol Old Vic Company in January 1950, appearing as Phebe in As You Like It, Anni in Denis Cannan's Captain Carvallo and Belinda in John Vanbrugh's The Provok'd Wife. She joined the Old Vic company in London for the 1950–51 season, playing Win-the-Fight Littlewit in Ben Jonson's Bartholomew Fair, Ann Page in The Merry Wives of Windsor and Princess Katharine in Henry V.

At the Lyric Theatre in September 1951, she played Martina in Christopher Fry's Thor with Angels, followed in January 1952 by Hero in John Gielgud's production of Much Ado About Nothing at the Phoenix Theatre.

Subsequent roles included:

- Rose Pemberton in The Living Room (Graham Greene), Wyndham's Theatre, April 1953
- Sally Bowles in I Am a Camera (John Van Druten), New Theatre, March 1954
- Joan in The Lark (Jean Anouilh), Lyric Hammersmith, March 1955
- Hedvig in The Wild Duck, Saville Theatre, December 1955
- Caroline Traherne in The Gates of Summer, touring, September 1956
- Jean Rice in The Entertainer, Royal Court, April 1957

=== Work with the RSC ===
Tutin first joined the Shakespeare Memorial Theatre Company for the 1958 season in Stratford-upon-Avon, appearing as Juliet in Romeo and Juliet, Viola in Twelfth Night and Ophelia in Hamlet. With the same company (but renamed the Royal Shakespeare Company from January 1961), she appeared as:

- Cressida in Troilus and Cressida, Royal Shakespeare Theatre, Stratford, July 1960
- Viola in Twelfth Night, Aldwych Theatre, December 1960 (Evening Standard Awards Best Actress)
- Sister Jeanne in The Devils, Aldwych, February 1961.
- Juliet in Romeo and Juliet, Stratford, August 1961
- Desdemona in Othello, Stratford October 1961, Aldwych, October 1962
- Varya in The Cherry Orchard, Aldwych, December 1961 and October 1962
- Polly Peachum in The Beggar's Opera, Aldwych, July 1963

Other work included:

- Beatrice in Beatrice et Benedict (concert version) Royal Festival Hall, November 1963
- Queen Victoria in Portrait of a Queen, Bristol Old Vic March 1965; Vaudeville Theatre, May 1965; and Henry Miller NY, February 1968 (Tony nominee)
- Rosalind in As You Like It, RSC Stratford and Aldwych, summer 1967, then at the Ahmanson Theatre, Los Angeles, January 1968
- Ann in Ann Veronica, Belgrade Theatre, Coventry, February 1969
- Francine in Play on Love, St Martin's Theatre, January 1970
- Alice in Arden of Faversham, RSC Theatregoround Festival, Roundhouse, November 1970
- Kate in Old Times, Aldwych, June 1971
- Title role in Peter Pan, London Coliseum, December 1971 and 1972
- Maggie Wylie in What Every Woman Knows, touring, March 1972 and Albery Theatre, November 1974
- Natalya Petrovna in A Month in the Country, Chichester Festival Theatre, 1974 season; and (for Prospect Productions) Albery Theatre, November 1975 (Evening Standard Awards Best Actress) & (Olivier Award for Best Actress in a Revival)
- Lady Macbeth in Macbeth, Yvonne Arnaud Theatre, October 1976
- Cleopatra in Antony and Cleopatra, Edinburgh Festival 1977 and Old Vic November 1977
- Madame Ranevsky in The Cherry Orchard, National Theatre, Olivier, February 1978
- Lady Macbeth in Macbeth, National, Olivier, June 1978
- Lady Plyant in The Double Dealer, National, Olivier, September 1978 (Olivier Award for Best Actress in a Revival)
- Genia Hofreiter in Undiscovered Country, National, Olivier, June 1979
- Madame Dubarry in Reflections, Theatre Royal Haymarket, March 1980
- Hester Collyer in The Deep Blue Sea, Greenwich Theatre September 1981
- Sarah in After the Lions by Ronald Harwood. World premiere directed by Michael Elliott at the Royal Exchange, Manchester 1982
- Deborah in A Kind of Alaska (part of a Pinter Other Places triple-bill), Duchess Theatre, March 1985
- Blanche Jerome in Brighton Beach Memoirs, Aldwych Theatre, December 1986
- Sonia in Loleh Bellon's Thursday's Ladies, Apollo Theatre, September 1987
- Edna Selby in Harlequinade and Millie Crocker-Harris in The Browning Version, Royalty Theatre, March 1988
- Desiree Armfeldt in A Little Night Music, Minerva Theatre, Chichester, August 1989; Piccadilly Theatre, October 1989
- Elderly Woman in Mountain Language and Melissa in Party Time (Harold Pinter), Almeida Theatre, November 1991
- Rhoda Monkhams in Rodney Ackland's After October, Minerva, Chichester, May 1997, Richmond Theatre and Greenwich Theatre, June 1997, co-starring with Nicholas Waring
- Fonsia Dorsey in The Gin Game, Savoy Theatre, March 1999, co-starring with Joss Ackland

=== Films and television ===
Tutin won the role of Cecily in Anthony Asquith's film version of Oscar Wilde's The Importance of Being Earnest (1952), for which she received a BAFTA nomination for Most Promising Newcomer). She then played Polly Peachum to Laurence Olivier's Macheath in Peter Brook's film version of The Beggar's Opera (1953).

Her next major film role was as Lucie in the film A Tale of Two Cities (1958), opposite Dirk Bogarde.

She continued to divide her appearances among stage, TV and film, appearing in the title role of a television production of Jean Anouilh's Antigone (1959) and the film Cromwell (1970) as Queen Henrietta Maria, and then played Anne Boleyn in the BBC's series The Six Wives of Henry VIII (also 1970), which starred Keith Michell in the title role. She also played Margot Asquith, the wife of Prime Minister H.H. Asquith, in the dramatic series Number 10 (1983). She appeared in the Ken Russell film Savage Messiah (1972), and was a panellist over many years (at least from 1967 to 1983) on Face the Music.

She also performed as the teacher Sarah Burton in the TV series South Riding (1974), based on the novel South Riding by Winifred Holtby. She starred as Mrs. Alving in Yorkshire Television production of Ibsen's Ghosts (1977). In the early 1980s, Tutin also appeared in the made-for-television film Murder with Mirrors (1985, based on an Agatha Christie novel) along with Helen Hayes and Bette Davis. Another of her notable roles was as Goneril in an Emmy-winning television production of Shakespeare's King Lear (1983), opposite Laurence Olivier as King Lear. She guest starred in an episode of the 1980s TV-series Robin of Sherwood as Lady Margaret of Gisbourne.

== Awards and nominations ==
Year	Award	Category	Work	Result	Ref
1953	BAFTA Film Award	Most Promising Newcomer to Film	The Importance of Being Earnest	Nominated	
1960	Evening Standard Award	Best Actress	Twelfth Night	Won	
1960	Tony Award	Best Actress in a Play	Portrait of a Queen	Nominated	
1971	BAFTA TV Award	Best Actress	The Six Wives of Henry VIII / Somerset Maugham Series (Flotsam and Jetsam)	Nominated	
1973	BAFTA Film Award	Best Actress	Savage Messiah	Nominated	
1975	Evening Standard Award	Best Actress	A Month in the Country	Won	
1975	BAFTA TV Award	Best Actress	South Riding	Nominated	
1976	Olivier Award	Best Actress in a Revival	A Month in the Country	Won	
1978	Olivier Award	Best Actress in a Revival	The Double Dealer	Won	

== Honours ==
Tutin was created Commander of the Order of the British Empire (CBE) in 1967 and raised to Dame Commander (DBE) in 2000.

== Filmography ==
Year	Title	Role	Notes
1952	The Importance of Being Earnest	Cecily Cardew	
1953	The Beggar's Opera	Polly Peachum	
1958	A Tale of Two Cities	Lucie Manette	
1970	Cromwell	Queen Henrietta Maria	
1972	The Spy's Wife	Hilda Tyler	
1972	Savage Messiah	Sophie Brzeska	
1985	The Shooting Party	Lady Minnie Nettleby	
1985	Murder with Mirrors	Mildred Strete	
1994	Great Moments in Aviation	Gwendolyne Quim	
1996	Indian Summer	Luna	
