= Spofford (play) =

- Written by: Herman Shumlin
- Original language: English
- Setting: A town in Connecticut. The present.

Premiere
- Date premiered: 14 December 1967
- Place premiered: ANTA Playhouse, New York

Spofford is a 1967 play based on episodes from the novel Reuben, Reuben by Peter DeVries. Melvyn Douglas appeared in the original Broadway run. The play was written and directed by Herman Shumlin. It was the one play written by Shumlin, who was known for his work as a producer and director.

The play was profiled in the William Goldman book The Season: A Candid Look at Broadway. The show ran for 202 performances, which Goldman put down to Douglas and some decent reviews. According to Goldman, "Someone who had been with the production all the way" felt the play was "too literary... but the critics loved Douglas and forgave us. The play’s too damn dull for raves. We got the best notices we could, and even though they were good, a certain seepage of dullness crept out. Face it; we were lucky.”

Goldman added the production "is a perfect example of what makes Broadway such a crap game. It was a bore, but it had a nice job by Douglas, so there were at least two possible reactions. You could have said, “A nice job by Douglas can’t save Spofford from being a bore”; or you could have said, as the critics tended to, “Douglas makes Spofford a gentle, pleasant evening in the theatre.” These freak things happen."

However even though the play ran for over six months it lost its entire investment.

== Premise ==
A Connecticut chicken farmer decides to find out about the rich.
