= Plaza Suite =

Play written by Neil Simon

- Broadway poster
- Original language: English
- Written by: Neil Simon
- Characters: Sam Nash; Karen Nash; Jesse Kiplinger; Muriel Tate; Roy Hubley; Norma Hubley
- Genre: Comedy
- Setting: Suite 719; Plaza Hotel; New York City

Premiere
- Date: February 14, 1968
- Place: Plymouth Theatre; New York City

Plaza Suite is a comedy play by Neil Simon.

== Plot ==
The play is composed of three acts, each involving different characters but all set in Suite 719 of New York City's Plaza Hotel. The first act, Visitor From Mamaroneck, introduces the audience to not-so-blissfully wedded couple Sam and Karen Nash, who are revisiting their honeymoon suite in an attempt by Karen to bring the love back into their marriage. Her plan backfires and the two become embroiled in a heated argument about whether or not Sam is having an affair with his secretary. The act ends with Sam leaving (allegedly to attend to urgent business) and Karen sadly reflecting on how much things have changed since they were young.

The second act, Visitor from Hollywood, involves a meeting between movie producer Jesse Kiplinger and his childhood sweetheart, suburban housewife Muriel Tate. Serial divorcé Jesse attempts to seduce Muriel, who represents to him a longed-for innocence and purity. Meanwhile, celebrity-obsessed Muriel wants to hear every sordid detail of Hollywood life. She attempts to maintain her virtuous self-image which becomes increasingly at odds with her behaviour, and the act ends with the pair beginning to have sex as Muriel makes Jesse recite the names of the celebrities he sat nearby at the most recent Academy Awards dinner.

The third act, Visitor from Forest Hills, revolves around married couple Roy and Norma Hubley on their daughter Mimsey's wedding day. In a rush of nervousness, Mimsey has locked herself in the suite's bathroom and refuses to leave. Her parents make frantic attempts to cajole her into attending her wedding while the gathered guests await the trio's arrival downstairs. It appears that the marriage will go ahead, as the act ends.

== Background ==
The play originally had four acts, one of which was cut during pre-production. Simon later expanded it for the 1970 feature film The Out-of-Towners.

== Productions ==
Before its Broadway run, Plaza Suite premiered in 1968 at the Shubert Theatre in New Haven and the Colonial Theatre in Boston. Plaza Suite opened on Broadway at the Plymouth Theatre on February 14, 1968, and closed on October 3, 1970, after 1,097 performances and two previews. Directed by Mike Nichols, the cast featured George C. Scott and Maureen Stapleton who appeared in each of the three acts with Bob Balaban in two acts. Clive Barnes in his review for The New York Times wrote that "after a slow start with the first, warms up with the second and ends with an all-stops-out, grandstand finish with the third." Later in the run, they were replaced by Dan Dailey, E. G. Marshall, Don Porter, Nicol Williamson, Barbara Baxley, and Peggy Cass.

The play was profiled in the William Goldman book The Season: A Candid Look at Broadway. Noël Coward, who three years earlier had written and starred in Suite in Three Keys—three plays with different characters, all set in the same hotel suite—later said of Plaza Suite, "Such a good idea having different plays all played in a hotel suite! I wonder where Neil Simon got it from?"

Mike Nichols won the Tony Award for Best Direction of a Play. Neil Simon was nominated for the Tony Award for Best Play but lost to Tom Stoppard for Rosencrantz and Guildenstern Are Dead. Maureen Stapleton was nominated for the Tony Award for Best Performance by a Leading Actress in a Play but lost to Zoe Caldwell in The Prime of Miss Jean Brodie.

A West Coast production, with engagements in San Francisco and Los Angeles, opened on September 16, 1968. It starred Dan Dailey and Lee Grant. The production closed March 1, 1969.

The play's first national tour, starring Forrest Tucker and Betty Garrett and Dana Ivey in the supporting female roles, opened on October 7, 1968. Replacement actors included Howard Keel and Larry Parks. Among the tour's stops was Chicago for a nearly eight-month engagement. It concluded on February 14, 1970, in Philadelphia.

Garrett and Parks, married in real life, starred in a bus and truck tour that lasted from October 16, 1970, through April 25, 1971.

A Broadway revival was initially set to play at the Hudson Theatre, beginning with previews on March 13, 2020, and officially on April 13, following a pre-Broadway run at the Colonial Theatre in Boston in February 2020. However, due to the closure of Broadway houses caused by the COVID-19 pandemic, the Broadway run was postponed. In June 2021, it was reported that the production would begin preview performances on February 25, 2022, and officially open on March 28. The production starred Matthew Broderick and Sarah Jessica Parker and is directed by John Benjamin Hickey. In April 2022, the production temporarily paused performances after both Broderick and Parker tested positive for COVID-19. The revival was initially set to close on June 28, 2022, but its run was later extended to July 10 of that year to compensate for cancelled performances.

In June 2023 it was announced that the Broadway production of Plaza Suite would transfer to London's West End, with Broderick and Parker reprising their respective roles, and Hickey returning to direct. The production opened at the Savoy Theatre in previews from January 17, 2024, with an official opening night on January 28. Announced as a strictly-limited run of ten weeks, playing until March 30, due to demand the production extended its run by two weeks, and it played until April 13.

== Other adaptations ==
Simon adapted his play for an American 1971 film starring Walter Matthau, Stapleton, Barbara Harris, and Lee Grant, but he was unhappy with the outcome. He felt the conceit of one actor playing the lead role in all three acts worked on stage but not on screen, especially if the actor was Matthau, who he felt was the right choice only for the beleaguered father-of-the-bride, Roy Hubley.

On December 31, 1982, American cable TV channel HBO broadcast a production (shot in front of a live audience) starring Lee Grant and Jerry Orbach playing all three roles.

West German TV channel SWR filmed and broadcast the play in 1986. This version was later made available on DVD.

In December 1987, Carol Burnett starred in an American ABC television movie in which she portrayed all three female roles. Starring opposite her were Hal Holbrook as Sam Nash, Dabney Coleman as Jesse Kiplinger, and Richard Crenna as Roy Hubley. Burnett was also the executive producer with direction by Roger Beatty and Kenny Solms.

America's L.A. Theatre Works produced the first radio adaption of the play in 1995, for broadcast on BBC Radio 4 and KCRW.

== Awards and nominations ==
=== Original Broadway production ===
Year	Award	Category	Nominee	Result
1968	Tony Award	Best Play		Nominated
1968	Tony Award	Best Actress in a Play	Maureen Stapleton	Nominated
1968	Tony Award	Best Direction of a Play	Mike Nichols	Won

=== 2022 Broadway revival ===
Year	Award	Category	Nominee	Result
2022	Tony Awards	Best Costume Design of a Play	Jane Greenwood	Nominated
