= A Minor Adjustment =

1967 play

- Written by: Eric Nicol
- Original language: English

Premiere
- Date premiered: 6 October 1967

A Minor Adjustment is a 1967 play. It was written by Eric Nicol, a Canadian humorist. The play was originally titled Like Father, Like Fun and realised to audiences in 1966 in Vancouver.

The title was then changed in 1967.

The original production cost $72,000 and closed after 13 performances. It received a poor review in The New York Times.

The play was profiled in the William Goldman book The Season: A Candid Look at Broadway.
