= Halfway Up the Tree =

- Written by: Peter Ustinov
- Original language: English
- Genre: comedy

Premiere
- Date premiered: 7 November 1967

Halfway Up the Tree is a comedy play about a British general who pretends to be a hippie. It was originally a stage vehicle for Robert Morley.

The play was profiled in the William Goldman book The Season: A Candid Look at Broadway.
