= Something Different (play) =

- Written by: Carl Reiner
- Original language: English

Premiere
- Date premiered: 28 November 1967
- Place premiered: Cort Theatre, New York

Something Different is a 1967 comedy play by Carl Reiner. Reiner directed the original production which starred Bob Dishy.

The play was profiled in the William Goldman book The Season: A Candid Look at Broadway.
