= Brief Lives (play) =

Play written by Patrick Garland

- 1967 playbill cover
- Written by: Patrick Garland
- Original language: English

Premiere
- Date premiered: 1967

Brief Lives is a British play about John Aubrey, a 17th-century Englishman who met and kept accounts of many of the famous men of his day, including René Descartes, Thomas Hobbes and Christopher Wren. It premiered in 1967 and became one of the most successful one person shows in history. Roy Dotrice played Aubrey in many productions.

The play came out of an episode about Aubrey in Famous Gossips (1965), the BBC television series Garland made with Alan Bennett.

The play was profiled in the William Goldman book The Season: A Candid Look at Broadway.

== Productions ==
The play originally opened at the Hampstead Theatre Club in 1967. It then ran at the John Golden Theater in New York City, and had a 400 performance run at the Criterion Theatre in London. Following a 1974 run at New York's Booth Theatre, the play was toured globally. At the end of the tour in 1979, Dotrice had completed over 1700 performances.

Outside of Broadway and the West End, the play was produced at Canada's Stratford Festival in 1980 with Douglas Rain as Aubrey.
