= What Did We Do Wrong? =

- Original language: English
- Written by: Henry Denker
- Subject: generation gap
- Genre: comedy
- Setting: The Davis living room, White Plains, N.Y. Present time.

Premiere
- Date: 9 October 1967
- Place: Helen Hayes Theatre

What Did We Do Wrong? is a comedy play about a businessman who turns hippie. The original Broadway production starred Paul Ford and cost $75,000. It only had a short run, lasting 48 performances.

The play was profiled in the William Goldman book The Season: A Candid Look at Broadway which noted it had a nearly identical plot to another play that season, Peter Ustinov's Halfway up the Tree. Goldman wrote "Sitting through one play with this plot is punishment enough for one season: sitting through two is enemy action... There were two plays with the same story because, like good news, bad ideas travel fast. And what was so bad? Basically, the overpoweringly simpleminded solutions that the plays offer. At a time when students from Columbia to Paris are losing blood because, from where they are, the world looks rotten, it is simply false to suggest that if only a mirror were held up to them they would all quickly hop back into their Brooks Brothers costumes."

Producer Michael Myerberg said the play "was a hit until the day we opened in New York." The entire investment of $75,000 as lost. "It was a boulevard comedy," said Myerbeg. "Just for entertainment, no messages, but funny. That kind of play has fallen out of fashion in New York."

It became the subject of legal battles between Denker and the producer Michael Myerberg.

== Original Broadway cast ==
- Philippa Bevans as Norma Davis
- Paul Ford as Walter Davis
- Hugh Franklin as Clarence Cahill
- Russell Horton as Walter Davis Jr.
- Enid Markey as Charlotte Cahill
- Roy Providence as Woody
- Gregory Rozakis as Scott
- Heidi Vaughn as Cindy
