= The Happy Time (musical) =

- Music: John Kander
- Lyrics: Fred Ebb
- Book: N. Richard Nash
- Basis: Samuel A. Taylor's play The Happy Time
- Productions: 1967 Los Angeles; 1968 Broadway; 1980 Connecticut; 1983 Lyric Opera of Kansas City; 2007 New York reading

The Happy Time is a musical with music by John Kander, lyrics by Fred Ebb, and a book by N. Richard Nash loosely based on a 1950 hit Broadway play, The Happy Time by Samuel A. Taylor, which was in turn based on stories by Robert Fontaine. The story had also been made into a 1952 film version.

The original 1967 Los Angeles and 1968 Broadway productions were directed and choreographed by Gower Champion, who won Tony Awards in each category.

== Background ==
Producer David Merrick had initially asked Cy Coleman and Dorothy Fields to write the songs and Yves Montand to play the lead, but they were all busy with other projects and declined to participate. Merrick then asked N. Richard Nash to write the script, but Nash suggested an original story of his own. Merrick, holding the rights to The Happy Time, asked that the setting be changed to Canada, and the deal was set. The final script had little of the Taylor play but did use the characters and some minor details from Fontaine's stories. Nash showed the outline of the story to Kander and Ebb, who agreed to write the music.

Merrick had approached Gower Champion to direct the new musical. Champion agreed, with the provision that it open in Los Angeles at the Ahmanson Theatre. Rehearsals began in September 1967 in Los Angeles, and the show opened on November 19 at the Ahmanson. Although the reviews were poor, the show was sold out. The show ran to December 23, 1967.

The Happy Time opened on Broadway at The Broadway Theatre on January 18, 1968. It received mixed reviews from the critics, who generally admired the performances but noted large deficiencies in the script. It closed on September 28, 1968, after a run of 286 sparsely attended performances and 23 previews. It was the first Broadway musical to lose a million dollars. The production was directed, filmed, and choreographed by Gower Champion, set design by Peter Wexler, costume design by Freddy Wittop, lighting design by Jean Rosenthal, film sequences created by Christopher Chapman, film technical direction by Barry O. Gordon, orchestrations by Don Walker, musical direction and vocal arrangements by Oscar Kosarin, associate choreography by Kevin Carlisle, and dance and incidental music arrangements by Marvin Laird. John Serry Sr. collaborated as the orchestral accordionist in the Broadway production.

== Synopsis ==
Jacques Bonnard is a prize-winning photographer who travels the world. He returns to his 1920s French-Canadian village, after five years away, seeking the happy time of his childhood. His cantankerous but lovable father (Grandpere), two brothers and their wives, and their children all welcome him ("He's Back"). His stories of his travels have a profound effect on his nephew Bibi, who is having trouble at school and going through an especially rough puberty, inspiring the boy to want to live life to the fullest. Jacques goes to a nightclub and takes Grandpere and Bibi, where they are entertained by the dancers (Six Angels) ("Catch My Garter"). After their night on the town, Bibi begs Jacques to "Please Stay".

When Bibi takes Grandpere's "naughty" pictures to school and is discovered, his stern father Philippe forces him to apologize to his school-mates. Bibi is embarrassed and upset and tries to cajole Jacques into taking him away when he leaves. Although Jacques at first agrees, thinking that Bibi will be a companion, he quickly realizes that this would not be good for Bibi.

Meanwhile, Jacques finds it difficult to commit to his former sweetheart Laurie ("I Don't Remember You"). The couple finally realize that they have opposite ideas about life and the future ("Seeing Things"), with Laurie understanding that Jacques is emotionally a boy, like her students. Grandpere, Jacques and Bibi playfully sing an ode to "A Certain Girl". Jacques finally realizes that he returned home searching for family and love ("Running"), and understands that he must set out alone again.

== Original cast and characters ==
| Character | Broadway (1968) |
|---|---|
| Jacques Bonnard | Robert Goulet |
| Suzanne Bonnard | Jeanne Arnold |
| Philippe Bonnard | George S. Irving |
| Bibi Bonnard | Michael Rupert |
| Louis Bonnard | Charles Durning |
| Annabelle Bonnard | Kim Freund |
| Gillie Bonnard | Julane Stites |
| Nanette Bonnard | Connie Simmons |
| Felice Bonnard | June Squibb |
| Grandpere Bonnard | David Wayne |
| Laurie Mannon | Julie Gregg |

== Songs ==
Act I

- "The Happy Time" – Jacques Bonnard and Family
- "Jeanne-Marie" - Jacques and Family +
- "He's Back" – Family
- "Catch My Garter" – Six Angels
- "Tomorrow Morning" – Jacques, Grandpere, Bibi, and Six Angels
- "Please Stay" – Bibi and Jacques
- "I Don't Remember You" – Jacques
- "St. Pierre" – Glee Club, Laurie Mannon, and Jacques
- "I Don't Remember You (Reprise)" – Laurie and Jacques
- "Without Me" – Bibi and Schoolmates
- "In His Own Good Time" - Suzanne and Phillipe +
- "The Happy Time (Reprise)" – Jacques

Act II

- "Among My Yesterdays" – Jacques
- "Please Stay (Reprise)" - Laurie +
- "The Life of the Party" – Grandpere, Six Angels, and Schoolboys
- "I'm Sorry" - Bibi +
- "Seeing Things" – Jacques and Laurie
- "A Certain Girl" – Grandpere, Jacques, and Bibi
- "Running" - Jacques +
- "St. Pierre" - Bibi, Laurie, and Glee Club
- "The Happy Time (Reprise)" – Jacques and Company

+Denotes songs added during the revised 2002 Niagara University production.

== Productions ==
The Goodspeed Opera House, East Haddam, Connecticut, presented the show in April 1980-May 1980. The production was revised, by rewriting the book "so that it no longer changes its tune in the second act", eliminating photographic projections and adding four songs that had been dropped.

In May 2002, the Niagara University Theatre in Niagara Falls, New York staged a revival of The Happy Time. John Kander and Fred Ebb went to Niagara University to work with the cast, helping recreate the work. "They were here a few weeks ago for rehearsals and thought the show was just beautiful..." Most notably, they incorporated five songs, originally cut from the musical, into the production, as well as making a few other minor changes. "This NU Theatre production, with Kander and Ebb's blessing, has reinstated several songs and restored text, prompting them to label this version 'definitive.'"

The revised version was performed in New York City for the first time in 2007 in a staged reading by "Musicals Tonight!", as part of their season long tribute to George S. Irving, who returned to the show, this time playing Jacques' father, Grandpere.

The Signature Theatre in Arlington, VA staged a revised production of The Happy Time from April 1, 2008 through June 1, 2008. The production was directed by Michael Unger and choreographed by Karma Camp. It received favorable reviews. For example, the Washington Post reviewer wrote: "A little charmer... Effervescent. The cast is strong... which is part of why it generally feels like a luxury to be able to see the show in this space." Variety agreed: "Fresh and earnest... staged with ultimate intimacy in Signature's tiny ARK Theater."

The musical was profiled in the William Goldman book The Season: A Candid Look at Broadway (Hal Leonard Corporation, 1984; ISBN 0879100230). Goldman noted that "the projections simply overpowered the small size and feel of the show." (pg. 295).

== Awards and nominations ==
=== Original Broadway production ===
| Year | Award | Category | Nominee | Result | Ref |
|---|---|---|---|---|---|
| 1968 | Tony Award | Best Musical | | Nominated | |
| 1968 | Tony Award | Best Original Score | John Kander and Fred Ebb | Nominated | |
| 1968 | Tony Award | Best Performance by a Leading Actor in a Musical | Robert Goulet | Won | |
| 1968 | Tony Award | Best Performance by a Leading Actor in a Musical | David Wayne | Nominated | |
| 1968 | Tony Award | Best Performance by a Featured Actor in a Musical | Michael Rupert | Nominated | |
| 1968 | Tony Award | Best Performance by a Featured Actress in a Musical | Julie Gregg | Nominated | |
| 1968 | Tony Award | Best Direction of a Musical | Gower Champion | Won | |
| 1968 | Tony Award | Best Choreography | Gower Champion | Won | |
| 1968 | Tony Award | Best Scenic Design | Peter Wexler | Nominated | |
| 1968 | Tony Award | Best Costume Design | Freddy Wittop | Nominated | |
| 1968 | Theatre World Award | | Julie Gregg | Won | |
| 1968 | Theatre World Award | | Michael Rupert | Won | |

== Recordings ==
The Original Broadway cast recording was released by RCA Victor Broadway in January 1968 and the CD was released on March 10, 1992.
