= The Unknown Soldier and His Wife =

- Written by: Peter Ustinov
- Subject: war

Premiere
- Date: 1967

The Unknown Soldier and His Wife is a 1967 play by Peter Ustinov. The play opened at the Vivian Beaumont Theater on July 6, 1967, after being previewed the week before. The play's initial run of 148 performances was directed by John Dexter and had its scenery and costumes designed by the Motley Theatre Design Group.

The play was profiled in the William Goldman book The Season: A Candid Look at Broadway.
