= Dr. Cook's Garden =

1967 play by Ira Levin, adapted as TV film

- Original language: English
- Written by: Ira Levin

Premiere
- Date: September 25, 1967
- Place: New York
- Directed by: Ira Levin

Dr. Cook's Garden is a play by Ira Levin. It was adapted as a TV movie in 1971 starring Bing Crosby.

== Plot ==
James Tennyson is a young and idealistic physician who returns to his hometown of Greenfield, Vermont to work with his mentor Dr. Leonard Cook, who is a father figure to him. Tennyson's real father was an abusive brute who broke his arm in a drunken rage. Dr. Cook seems to be a positive role model to Tennyson and a pillar of the community who welcomes his young protégé home. Cook's housekeeper Dora tells Tennyson of her employer's heart troubles and how he needs an assistant. Upon his homecoming, Tennyson is reunited with Jane Rausch, his childhood sweetheart, and in the process begins to become suspicious of Cook's activities. He discovers that many of his patients have died suddenly and mysteriously. He also discovers in the doctor's medicine cabinet a large supply of poisons. The town constable tells Tennyson that he feels that the Lord has blessed the town because the "nice" people have lived to an old age and the mean ones have died off. He begins to look through the doctor's files and finds a mysterious code "R", which he notices is also in the doctor's garden, and he interprets it to mean removal of those that the doctor considers unworthy people. Tennyson confronts his mentor, who freely admits to euthanizing those that he considers unworthy. Cook tells Tennyson of killing his abusive father and defends his actions as a form of community service, using his beautiful garden as a metaphor. Tennyson promises not to turn Cook in to the authorities, on the condition that Cook immediately retire from medical practice. After pretending to agree to the plan, Cook attempts to poison Tennyson, and they wage a battle to the death, which ends in Cook suffering a heart attack and dying after Tennyson refuses to bring him his medicine in a perverse act of final mercy.

== Original production ==
The play opened on Broadway at the Belasco Theatre on September 25, 1967, with a cast including Burl Ives as Cook and Keir Dullea as Tennyson. George C. Scott was meant to direct but was replaced during rehearsals by Levin.

The play's Broadway production was covered in William Goldman's book on Broadway The Season: A Candid Look at Broadway.

== Television film ==
Dr. Cook's Garden
- Based on: Dr. Cook's Garden by Ira Levin
- Written by: Art Wallace
- Directed by: Ted Post
- Starring: Bing Crosby; Frank Converse; Blythe Danner; Barnard Hughes; Bethel Leslie
- Music by: Robert Drasnin
- Country of origin: United States
- Original language: English

Production
- Producer: Bob Markell
- Cinematography: Urs Furrer
- Editor: John McSweeney
- Running time: 75 minutes
- Production company: Paramount Television

Original release
- Network: ABC
- Release: January 19, 1971

The play was adapted for television in 1971 with Bing Crosby in the title role and Frank Converse as Dr. Tennyson. It was well received, with Variety stating: "Doctor Cook's Garden was an unusually satisfying entry in ABC's ‘Movie of the Week’ series...For Bing Crosby, the title role was an acting triumph. In his long list of films, Garden was only his second straight acting role (the other was The Country Girl in 1955) and he has indeed come a long way since his first ‘doctor’ film – Doctor Rhythm in 1938. Playing a part that easily could have been hammed-up, Crosby let the fictive character take over—no small trick for a star with a forty-year identity as a singer and light comedy artist."

Cast

- Bing Crosby as Dr. Leonard Cook
- Frank Converse as Jimmy Tennyson
- Blythe Danner as Janey Rausch
- Bethel Leslie as Essie Bullitt
- Barnard Hughes as Elias Hart
- Carol Morley as Mary Booth
- Staats Cotsworth as Ted Rausch
- Jordan Reed as Billy
- Abby Lewis as Dora Ludlow
- Fred Burrell as Harry Bullitt
- Thomas Barbour as Reverend
- Helen Stenborg as Ruth Hart

== See also ==
- List of American films of 1971
