= José Quintero =

Panamanian American theater director and producer

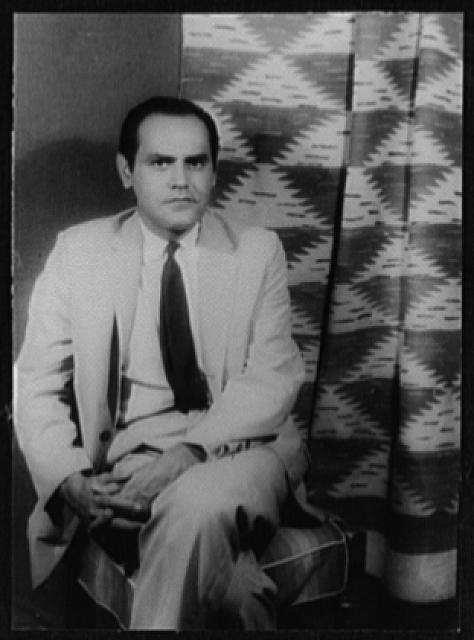
- Photo by Carl Van Vechten, 1958
- Born: José Benjamín Quintero Palmerola; 15 October 1924; Panama City, Panama
- Died: 26 February 1999 (aged 74); New York City, New York, U.S.
- Education: Los Angeles City College; University of Southern California (BA); Art Institute of Chicago (BFA)
- Occupation: Theatre director
- Years active: 1950s-1999
- Partner: Nicholas Tsacrios (1950s-1999)
- Awards: See below

José Benjamín Quintero Palmerola (15 October 1924 – 26 February 1999) was a Panamanian-American theatre director, producer, and pedagogue. He was best known for his interpretations of the works of Eugene O'Neill and for co-founding the Circle in the Square Theatre. He was the winner of two Tony Awards, one for Best Direction of a Play and one for Best Play, out of five total nominations.

== Early life and education ==
Quintero was born in Panama City, Panama, the fourth of 4 children, to Carlos Quintero Rivera and Consuelo Palmerola. As a boy he was an acolyte, though he described his childhood in other ways as a disaster—the result of a domineering and overbearing father. He was educated in the United States at Los Angeles City College, the University of Southern California, and the Goodman School of Drama at the Art Institute of Chicago (now at DePaul University). where he decided on a career in theatre. After notification of his intention, his father, who wanted him to be a physician, declared him dead, leading to José's seven-year estrangement from his family.

== Career ==
Quintero co-founded the Circle in the Square Theatre in Greenwich Village with Theodore Mann in 1951; this is regarded as the birth of Off-Broadway theatre. He became one of the most celebrated Broadway and Off-Broadway directors and producers and worked with some of the greatest names in American theatre. His own name is inextricably linked to that of the American playwright Eugene O'Neill. Quintero's interest contributed to the rediscovery of O'Neill. Quintero staged several of his works, including The Iceman Cometh in 1956, which launched the career of Jason Robards. Later that year, Quintero's production of the New York premiere of Long Day's Journey into Night established his reputation as the quintessential director of O'Neill's dramas and won Tony Awards for Best Play and Best Actor (Fredric March). In 1963, he directed Strange Interlude, with a cast which included Geraldine Page, Jane Fonda, Franchot Tone, Ben Gazzara, Pat Hingle and Betty Field. In 1967, he directed Ingrid Bergman in More Stately Mansions in Los Angeles and New York. In 1968, Quintero travelled to Mexico to direct the Mexican star Dolores del Río in The Lady of the Camellias but was dismissed by the actress because of his problem with alcohol. His production of A Moon for the Misbegotten, at the Academy Playhouse, Lake Forest, Illinois in 1973, won the Tony award for Best Direction in 1974. In 1988, he directed the revival of Long Day's Journey Into Night with Jason Robards Jr and Colleen Dewhurst. In the course of his career, Quintero directed O'Neill plays nineteen times.

Quintero did not limit himself to the works of O'Neill. He directed over seventy productions by a great number of writers, including Truman Capote, Jean Cocteau, Thornton Wilder, Jean Genet and Brendan Behan. He also directed plays by Tennessee Williams, including the 1952 production of Summer and Smoke which made Geraldine Page a star and the short-lived 1968 production of The Seven Descents of Myrtle.

In 1961, he directed Vivien Leigh and Warren Beatty in the film version of Williams's The Roman Spring of Mrs. Stone, which brought Lotte Lenya Oscar and Golden Globe nominations for Best Supporting Actress. This was the only feature film directorial credit of Quintero's career, though he did have a handful of television directing credits.

In 1973, he also directed three one-act plays at the Academy Playhouse in Lake Forest, Illinois. Hello From Bertha, Lady of Larkspur Lotion and The Orchestra. He chose a cast he said belonged on Broadway. The brilliant cast included Jeanie Columbo, Ralph Williams, Betty Miller, Nancy Wickwire, Charlotte Jones and Janet Dowd. In 1990, he directed Liv Ullmann in Noël Coward's Private Lives at the National Theatre in Oslo. He also directed operas for the Metropolitan Opera and the Dallas Opera.

Quintero was a noted teacher and lectured on theatre and gave master classes in acting and directing at the University of Houston and Florida State University. In 1996, he directed two early O'Neill plays, The Long Voyage Home and Ile, at the Provincetown Repertory Theater in Massachusetts.

== Memberships ==
- Directors Guild of America
- Stage Directors and Choreographers Society

== Personal life ==
Quintero battled alcoholism, and with the help of his life partner, Nicholas Tsacrios, was able to defeat his addiction in the 1970s.

=== Health issues and death ===
He was diagnosed with throat cancer in 1987, which necessitated the removal of his larynx, which ultimately led to his 1999 death at Memorial Sloan-Kettering Cancer Center in Manhattan. He remained active until nearly the end of his life.

== Legacy ==
The José Quintero Theatre on West 42nd Street in Manhattan was named in his honour. Quintero is also a member of the American Theater Hall of Fame. He was inducted in 1979.

The Jose Quintero Lab Theatre, a 200-seat black box theatre used by the University of Houston School of Theatre and Dance, is named in his honour.

== Productions ==
=== Theatre ===
- 1949: The Glass Menagerie (T. Williams), Woodstock Summer Theatre, New York.
- 1951: Dark of the Moon (Richardson and Berney), Circle in the Square Theatre, New York.
- 1951: Burning Bright (Steinbeck), Circle in the Square Theatre, New York.
- 1951: Bonds of Interest (Benavente y Martinez), Circle in the Square Theatre, New York.
- 1952: Yerma (Lorca), Circle in the Square Theatre, New York.
- 1952: Summer and Smoke (T. Williams), Circle in the Square Theatre, New York.
- 1953: The Grass Harp (Capote), Circle in the Square Theatre, New York.
- 1953: American Gothic (Wolfson), Circle in the Square Theatre, New York.
- 1953: In the Summer House (Bowles), Broadway, New York.
- 1954: The Girl on the Via Flaminia (Hayes), Circle in the Square Theatre, New York.
- 1954: Portrait of a Lady (Archibald, adapted from James), ANTA Theatre, New York.
- 1954: The Hostage (Behan), Circle in the Square Theatre, New York.
- 1955: The Long Christmas Dinner (Wilder), University of Boston, Massachusetts.
- 1955: The King and the Duke, Circle in the Square Theatre, New York.
- 1955: La Ronde (Schitzler), Circle in the Square Theatre, New York.
- 1955: The Cradle Song (Underhill), Circle in the Square Theatre, New York.
- 1955: The Iceman Cometh (O'Neill), Circle in the Square Theatre, New York.
- 1956: The Innkeepers (Apstein), New York.
- 1956: Long Day's Journey Into Night (O'Neill), Helen Hayes Theatre, New York.
- 1957: Lost in the Stars (M. Anderson), City Opera, New York.
- 1957: The Square Root of Wonderful (McCullers), Princeton University, New Jersey.
- 1958: Children of Darkness (Mayer), Circle in the Square Theatre, New York.
- 1958: A Moon for the Misbegotten (O'Neill), Festival of Two Worlds, Spoleto, Italy.
- 1958: Cavalleria Rusticana (Mascagni), Metropolitan Opera, New York.
- 1958: I Pagliacci (Leoncavallo), Metropolitan Opera, New York.
- 1958: The Quare Fellow (Behan), Circle in the Square Theatre, New York.
- 1959: Our Town (Wilder), Circle in the Square Theatre, New York.
- 1959: Macbeth (Shakespeare), Boston, Massachusetts.
- 1960: The Balcony (Genet), Circle in the Square Theatre, New York.
- 1960: Camino Real (T. Williams), Circle in the Square Theatre, New York.
- 1960: The Triumph of Saint Joan (Joio), City Opera, New York.
- 1960: Laurette (Young, adapted from Courtney), New Haven, Connecticut.
- 1961: Look, We've Come Through (Wheeler), New York.
- 1962: Plays for Bleecker Street (Wilder), Circle in the Square Theatre, New York.
- 1962: Great Day in the Morning (Cannon), New York.
- 1962: Pullman Car Hiawatha (Wilder), Circle in the Square Theatre, New York.
- 1963: Desire Under the Elms (O'Neill), Circle in the Square Theatre, New York.
- 1963: Strange Interlude (O'Neill), Broadway, New York.
- 1964: Marco Millions (O'Neill), Lincoln Center, New York.
- 1964: Hughie (O'Neill), Royale Theatre, New York.
- 1964: Susanna, Metropolitan Opera, New York.
- 1964: La Bohème (Puccini), Metropolitan Opera, New York.
- 1965: Diamond Orchid (Lawrence and Lee), New York.
- 1965: Matty and the Moron and the Madonna (Leiberman), New York.
- 1965: A Moon for the Misbegotten (O'Neill), Arena Stage, Buffalo, New York.
- 1966: Pousse Cafe, New York.
- 1967: More Stately Mansions (O'Neill), Ahmanson Theatre, Los Angeles, and New York.
- 1968: The Seven Descents of Myrtle (T. Williams), New York.
- 1968: The Lady of the Camellias (Dumas), Mexico City
- 1969: Episode in the Life of an Author (Anouilh) and The Orchestra (Anouilh), Buffalo, New York.
- 1970: Gandhi, Playhouse Theatre, New York.
- 1971: Johnny Johnson (Green), New York.
- 1971: The Big Coca-Cola Swamp in the Sky, Westport, Connecticut.
- 1973: A Moon for the Misbegotten (O'Neill), The Orchestra (Jean Annouilh), Hello From Bertha/Lady of Larkspur Lotion (T. Williams) Academy Playhouse/Academy Festival Theatre Lake Forest Ill.
- 1973: A Moon for the Misbegotten (O'Neill), Morosco Theatre, New York.
- 1974: Gabrielle (Quintero), Studio Arena, Buffalo, New York, and Washington, D.C.
- 1975: The Skin of Our Teeth (Wilder), Washington, D.C.
- 1975: A Moon for the Misbegotten (O'Neill), Oslo, Norway.
- 1976: Knock, Knock (Feiffer), New York.
- 1976: Hughie (O'Neill), Chicago, Illinois.
- 1977: Anna Christie (O'Neill), New York, Toronto, and Washington, D.C.
- 1977: A Touch of the Poet (O'Neill), New York.
- 1978: Same Time, Next Year, Oslo, Norway.
- 1978: The Bear (Chekhov) and The Human Voice (Cocteau), Melbourne and Sydney, Australia.
- 1979: The Human Voice (Cocteau), Circle in the Square Theatre, New York.
- 1979: Faith Healer (Friel), Boston, Massachusetts, and Longacre Theatre, New York.
- 1980: Clothes for a Summer Hotel (T. Williams), Washington, D.C., and Cort Theatre, New York.
- 1980: Welded (O'Neill), Columbia University, New York.
- 1980: Ah! Wilderness (O'Neill), National Theatre, Mexico City.
- 1981: The Time of Your Life (Saroyan), Brandeis University, Boston, Massachusetts.
- 1981: Ah! Wilderness (O'Neill), West Palm Beach, Los Angeles.
- 1983: Cat on a Hot Tin Roof (T. Williams), Mark Taper Forum, Los Angeles.
- 1984: Rainsnakes, Long Wharf Theatre, New Haven, Connecticut.
- 1985: The Iceman Cometh (O'Neill), Washington D.C., New York, and Los Angeles.
- 1988: Long Day's Journey into Night (O'Neill), Yale University and New York.
- 1990: Private Lives (Coward), Oslo, Norway.

=== Film ===
- 1961: The Roman Spring of Mrs. Stone

=== Television ===
- 1955: Windows
- 1959: Play of the Week ("Medea")
- 1959: The Art Carney Special ("Our Town")
- 1962-63: The Nurses (3 episodes)
- 1964-65: Profiles in Courage (2 episodes)
- 1975: A Moon for the Misbegotten (TV movie)
- 1979: The Human Voice (TV movie)
- 1981: Broadway on Showtime ("Hughie")

=== Radio ===
- 1988: In the Zone
- 1988: The Long Voyage Home
- 1989: The Moon of the Caribbees
- 1989: Bound East for Cardiff
- 1989: The Hairy Ape
- 1990: The Emperor Jones

== Bibliography ==
- Quintero, José (1974). If You Don't Dance They Beat You. Boston: Brown and Company. ISBN 0-316-72920-5.
- Gabrielle (Buffalo, New York, 1974). Play.
- Quintero, José (1974), Gabrielle, Buffalo, New York (play)

== Awards and nominations ==
Institution	Year	Category	Work	Result	Ref.
Drama Desk Awards	1956	Vernon Rice Award	The Iceman Cometh	nom	
Drama Desk Awards	1974	Outstanding Direction of a Play	A Moon for the Misbegotten	won	
Drama League Awards	1987	Unique Contribution to the Theatre	N/A	won	
Obie Awards	1956	Best Director	The Iceman Cometh	won	
Tony Awards	1957	Best Play	Long Day's Journey into Night	won	
Tony Awards	1957	Best Direction of a Play	Long Day's Journey into Night	nom	
Tony Awards	1962	Best Direction of a Play	Great Day in the Morning	nom	
Tony Awards	1974	Best Direction of a Play	A Moon for the Misbegotten	won	
Tony Awards	1986	Best Direction of a Play	The Iceman Cometh	nom	
