= Weekend (play) =

1968 comedy by Gore Vidal

- Original language: English
- Written by: Gore Vidal

Premiere
- Date: 13 March 1968

Weekend is a 1968 comedy play by Gore Vidal starring John Forsythe, Kim Hunter, and Carol Cole.

The play was profiled in the William Goldman book The Season: A Candid Look at Broadway.

== Plot ==
A Republican senator's son brings home a black girlfriend.

== Revival ==
The play was unsuccessful on Broadway but was revived in 2008.
