= Portrait of a Queen =

Play written by William Francis

- Written by: William Francis
- Characters: Queen Victoria
- Original language: English

Premiere
- Date premiered: 1965
- Place premiered: Bristol Old Vic

Portrait of a Queen is a play about the life of Queen Victoria based on her letters. Dorothy Tutin played the role of Victoria on the West End and Broadway.

The play was profiled in the William Goldman book The Season: A Candid Look at Broadway.
