= The Freaking Out of Stephanie Blake =

- Original language: English
- Written by: Richard Chandler
- Genre: Comedy

Premiere
- Date: October 30, 1967 (in previews; never officially opened)
- Place: Eugene O'Neill Theatre, New York

The Freaking Out of Stephanie Blake is a 1967 stage comedy which starred Jean Arthur and was produced by Cheryl Crawford. The play was written by Richard Chandler, who was Crawford's assistant. Although it ran in previews on Broadway, the play never officially opened.

== History ==
It was announced that Jean Arthur would appear on Broadway in the comedy The Freaking Out of Stephanie Blake in October 1967.

Director John Hancock quit during rehearsals after an argument with Chandler and was replaced by Crawford, and then Michael Kahn. Previews, which had been scheduled to begin on October 10, 1967, at the Eugene O'Neill Theatre, were postponed, with the revised preview opening set for October 30. Jean Arthur (who had $50,000 of her own money in the production) collapsed upon making her initial entrance during the third preview performance on November 1, informing the audience that she could not continue. She did in fact complete that performance, but immediately following the November 1 show, her doctor informed the show's producers that Arthur would be unable to continue due to nervous exhaustion. The show was scheduled to officially open on November 4, 1967, but it was announced that Arthur "had taken ill", and Crawford said "it was 'possible that the whole thing will have to be abandoned'". It cost an estimated $250,000.

The story of the production was profiled in William Goldman's The Season: A Candid Look at Broadway.

It was one of a series of plays that season which dealt with the generation gap.

== Plot ==
A spinster from Ohio comes to New York before embarking on a trip to Europe. She discovers her niece has fallen in with a bunch of hippies and becomes involved with them.
