= Clive Barnes =

English writer and critic (1927–2008)

Clive Barnes CBE
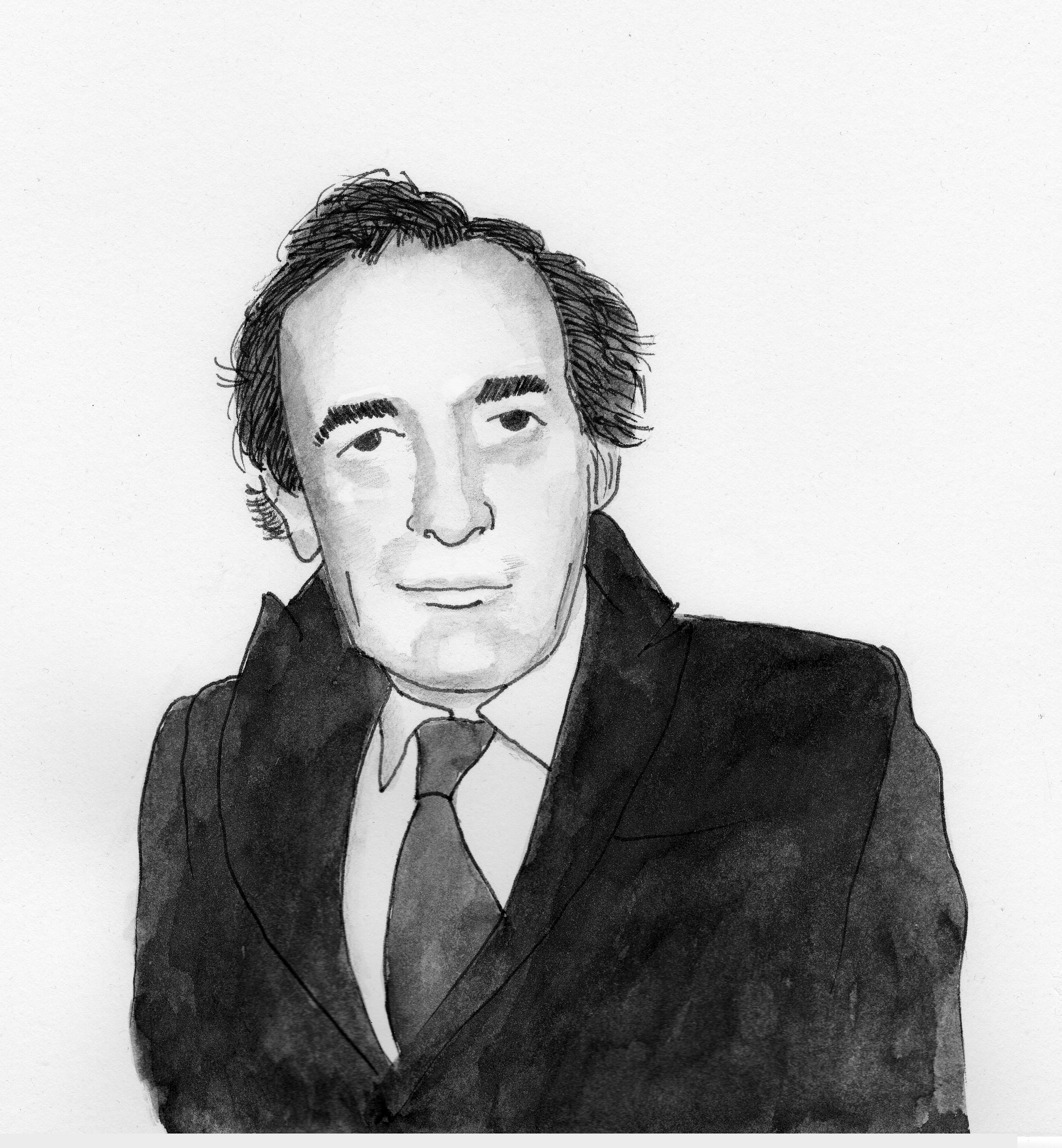
- Born: Clive Alexander Barnes; 13 May 1927; London, England
- Died: 19 November 2008 (aged 81); New York City, U.S.
- Education: Emanuel School; University of Oxford
- Occupations: Critic; journalist
- Spouses: Joyce Tolman (m. 1947, divorced); Patricia Winkley (m. 1958, divorced); Amy Pagnozzi (m. 1985, divorced); Valerie Taylor (m. 2004)
- Children: 2
- Writing career
- Period: 1949–2008
- Subjects: Dance; theatre

Clive Alexander Barnes CBE (13 May 1927 – 19 November 2008) was an English writer and critic. From 1965 to 1977, he was the dance and theatre critic for The New York Times, and, from 1978 until his death, the New York Post. Barnes had significant influence in reviewing new Broadway productions and evaluating the international dancers who often perform in New York City.

Barnes was a member of the executive committee of the Writers and Artists for Peace in the Middle East, a pro-Israel group.

== Background ==
Barnes was born in Lambeth, London, the only child of ambulance driver Arthur Lionel Barnes (1898–1940) and Freda Marguerite, née Garratt. Barnes' father was English and his mother was a Hungarian Jew. After their divorce when he was seven, he was raised by his mother.

Barnes was educated at Emanuel School in Battersea and then at St Catherine's College of the University of Oxford. He served in the Royal Air Force for two years.

== Career ==
Barnes began writing dance criticism in 1949, during his time at Oxford, and afterward, he was a writer and editor for Dance & Dancers, which he contributed to until its demise in 1998. In the 1950s, he was a freelance writer, contributing to the New Statesman, the Daily Express, and The Spectator; he also worked for the Greater London Council, until he was appointed the inaugural dance critic for The Times of London in 1961.

In 1963, Barnes began writing for The New York Times, and moved to New York in 1965 to become their dance critic and drama critic. In 1967, many of his duties as drama critic were given to Walter Kerr, as the paper's editors were concerned by the level of influence amassed by one person holding both roles. In 1978, after being asked to fully divest of his role as a drama critic, Barnes was hired by the New York Post, which allowed him to cover both mediums. He remained with the Post for the next thirty years, continuing to write there until a few weeks before his death.

Barnes authored and contributed to numerous books related to theatre and the performing arts, particularly dance. These include four volumes of 50 Best Plays of the American Theatre, nine series of Best American Plays (with John Gassner), American Ballet Theatre: A 25 Year Retrospective (with Elizabeth Kaye), the foreword to Masters of Movement: Portraits of America's Great Choreographers (by Rose Eichenbaum), Ballet in Britain Since the War, New York Times Directory of the Theater, Ballet Here and Now, Dance Scene USA, Inside American Ballet Theatre, as well as biographies of Tennessee Williams (1975) and Rudolf Nureyev (1982).

The British writer was known for his "lively and enthusiastic approach to criticism", which contributed to an upswing in dance criticism in New York City media. Writing for Variety, Gordon Cox said that Barnes "helped nurture the explosion of the form in Gotham in the 1970s." Regarding television, Barnes once wrote: "It is the first truly democratic culture, the first culture available to everyone and entirely governed by what the people want. The most terrifying thing is what people do want."

== Reception ==
The Daily Telegraph noted that Barnes sometimes wrote four reviews a day, possibly because New Yorkers were "greedy for his brand of pithy English open-mindedness". He was credited with having drawn attention to Nureyev and Baryshnikov, dancers who went on to attain great fame. The English writer was particularly good at identifying American talent and introducing artists such as George Balanchine and Martha Graham to London audiences. In his book on Broadway, The Season: A Candid Look at Broadway (1969), William Goldman called Barnes "the most dangerous, the most crippling critic in modern Broadway history." Goldman gave the following reasons for this conclusion:

(1) He has no ear for American speech;
(2) He cannot deal with American drama;
(3) He prefers, in all ways, English theatre to American theatre;
(4) He would find it not at all ignoble if Broadway were to become primarily an importing agent;
(5) He prefers ballet to theatre;
(6) He is a smart ass;
(7) He enjoys glorifying himself publicly through his position;
(8) He changes his opinions constantly, which is certainly the right of free men, but not so helpful when the life or death of a play is based on a critic's having the courage to say what he thinks now, not a month later in a ballet column;
(9) He has little interest in learning the financial aspects of Broadway, to which he is central.

— Goldman (1984). pp. 91–92

== Personal life and death ==
Barnes was married four times, with the first three marriages – to Joyce Tolman in 1947, to Patricia Winkley in 1958, and to Amy Pagnozzi in 1985 – ending in divorce; his fourth marriage, to Valerie Taylor, lasted from 2004 until his death. He had two children from his second marriage.

Barnes died from liver cancer at Mount Sinai Hospital in New York City on 19 November 2008.

== Legacy ==
=== Honours ===
He was appointed a Commander of the Order of the British Empire (CBE) by Queen Elizabeth II in 1975, and appointed a knight of the Order of the Dannebrog in 1972 by Queen Margrethe II of Denmark.

=== Clive Barnes Awards ===
The Clive Barnes Foundation was established in 2009 to administer the Clive Barnes Awards.
