= Song of the Grasshopper =

1967 play by Alfonso Paso

- Broadway production playbill cover, 1967
- Written by: Alfonso Paso; William Layton (translator); Augustin Penon (translator)
- Original language: Spanish

Premiere
- Date premiered: 28 September 1967 (US)

Song of the Grasshopper is a 1967 comedy play written by Alfonso Paso. The New York production starred Alfred Drake as Aristobulo.

== Production history ==
Song of the Grasshopper was originally written in Spanish by Spanish playwright Alfonso Paso. It was adapted into English for the Broadway production by William Layton and Agustin Penon and was directed by Charles Bowden, who was also a producer. The Broadway cast starred Alfred Drake. It also starred Jan Farrand and Ben Piazza, and featured Michael Enserro, Robin Ponterio, and Diana Davila. Scenic production was done by Oliver Smith, lighting was designed by Martin Aronstein, and costumes were designed by Noel Taylor.

The producers had never produced on Broadway before; nor had the translators adapted a Broadway play or had the director directed a Broadway production.

Song of the Grasshopper went into rehearsal on August 9, 1967. It had a try-out performance in Wilmington, which only filled 25% capacity of the theatre and received two negative reviews. It opened in Philadelphia a week later, to three negative reviews. Before the production moved to New York, a new writer joined the team to made edits to the script.

Song of the Grasshopper had four preview performances and opened on September 27, 1967 at the Anta Theatre on Broadway. It had four regular performances and closed on September 30, 1967. The New York Times described the production as a "disaster."

== Plot ==
The two-act play takes place at the house of Aristobulo "Aris" Rivas on the outskirts of Madrid. Aris is separated from his wife and has a few children from assorted women, plus a pet crocodile in his bathroom. He has no money, and has invested his last few coins in a raffle ticket. Despite this all, he still believes it'll all work out.
