= Joan of Lorraine =

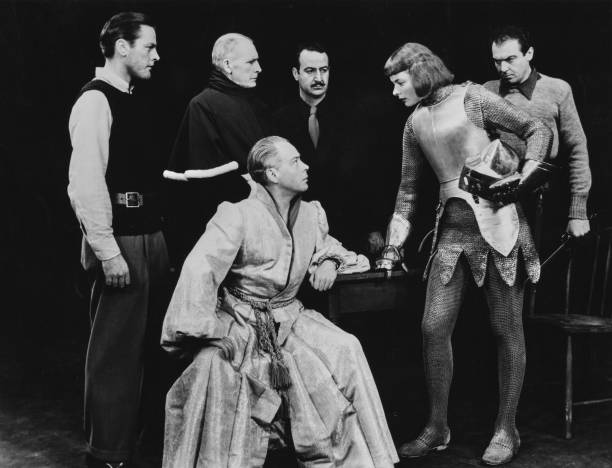
Ingrid Bergman, Joseph Wiseman, Sam Wanamaker and others in the original production

Joan of Lorraine is a 1946 play-within-a-play by Maxwell Anderson.

== Plot ==
It is about a company of actors who stage a dramatization of the story of Joan of Arc, and the effect that the story has on them. As in the musical Man of La Mancha, most of the actors in the drama play two or more roles.

The main character is Mary Grey, the fictional star actress who portrays Joan. As the play begins, Mary Grey and the fictional director of the play-within-a-play, Jimmy Masters, are in conflict over how Joan is to be played. The conflict is resolved during the course of the play.

== Production ==
Ingrid Bergman was the star of the original production, playing both Joan and Mary Grey, the fictional star actress who portrays her. Other notable actors who appeared in this production were Joseph Wiseman, Romney Brent and Sam Wanamaker.

== Awards ==
Ingrid Bergman won a Tony Award for Best Actress in a Play for this performance — one of the first such awards ever given.

== Adaptation ==
In 1948, an adaptation of Joan of Lorraine was filmed in Technicolor as Joan of Arc. This film also starred Ingrid Bergman, but it did not use the play-within-a-play framework. Instead, it made the story a straightforward account of Joan's life, omitting the fictional acting company altogether. Notably, it became the first film to receive seven Academy Award nominations and still not receive a Best Picture nomination.

Anderson's dialogue for the story of Joan was not only retained, but, in collaboration with Andrew Solt, expanded with additional scenes involving historical characters who do not appear in the original play. For her performance, Ingrid Bergman was nominated for an Academy Award, but lost out to Jane Wyman in Johnny Belinda.
