= Tony Award for Best Actress in a Play =

American theatre award for Broadway actresses

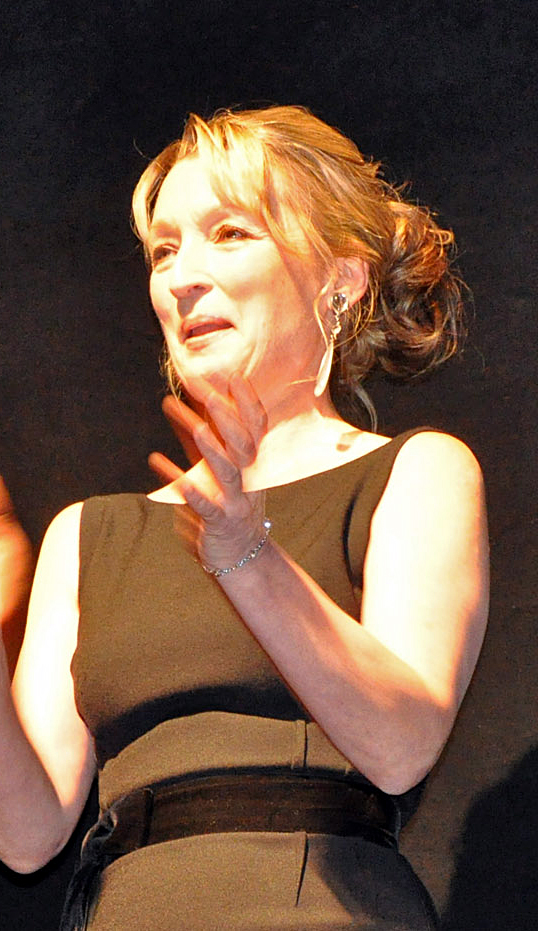
- 2026 Recipient: Lesley Manville
- Awarded for: Best Performance by a Leading Actress in a Play
- Location: New York City
- Presented by: American Theatre Wing, The Broadway League
- Currently held by: Lesley Manville for Oedipus (2026)
- Website: TonyAwards.com

The Tony Award for Best Performance by a Leading Actress in a Play is an honor presented at the Tony Awards, a ceremony established in 1947 as the Antoinette Perry Awards for Excellence in Theatre, to actresses for quality leading roles in a Broadway play. The awards are named after Antoinette Perry, an American actress who died in 1946.

Honors in several categories are presented at the ceremony annually by the Tony Award Productions, a joint venture of The Broadway League and the American Theatre Wing, to "honor the best performances and stage productions of the previous year."

The award was originally called the Tony Award for Actress—Play. It was first presented to Ingrid Bergman and Helen Hayes at the 1st Tony Awards for their portrayals of Mary Grey / Joan of Arc and Addie Bemis in Joan of Lorraine and Happy Birthday, respectively. Before 1956, nominees' names were not made public; the change was made by the awards committee to "have a greater impact on theatregoers".

There have been two ties and one three-way tie in this category. Julie Harris holds the record for having the most wins and nominations in this category, with a total of five wins from nine nominations. Medea in the play of the same name is the character to take the award the most times, winning three times.

== Winners and nominees ==
indicates the winner

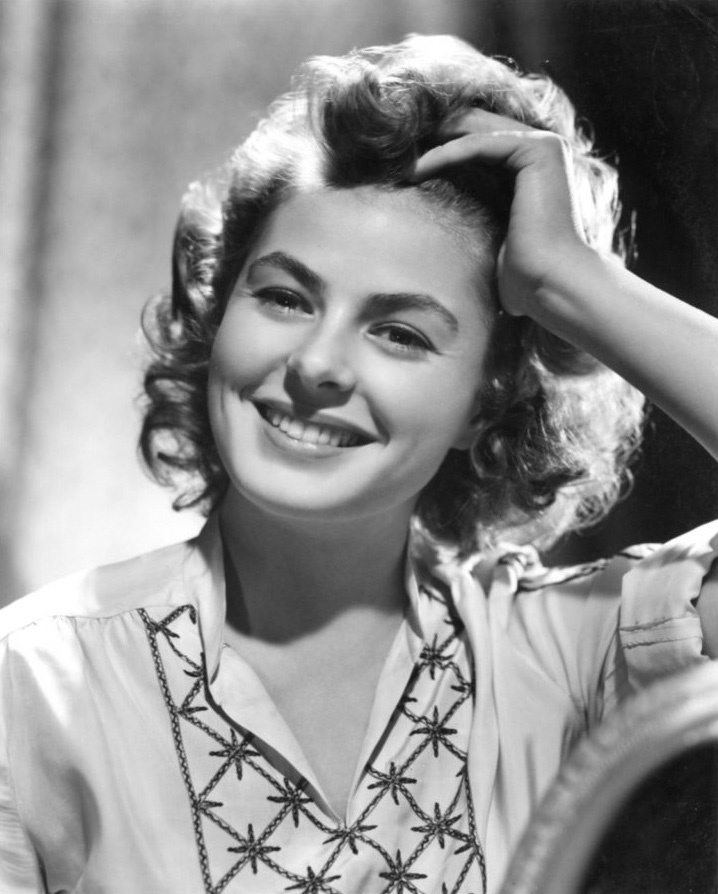
Ingrid Bergman won for Joan of Lorraine (1947)

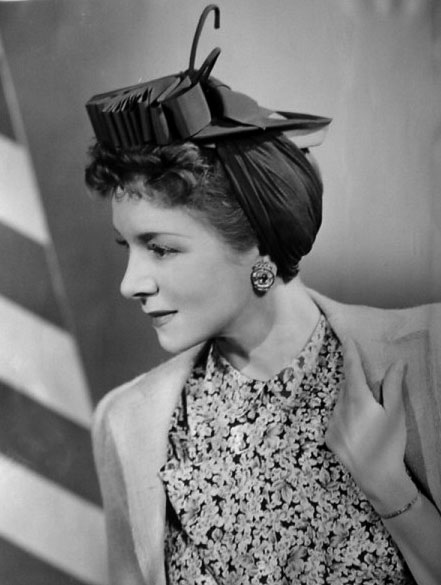
Helen Hayes won twice

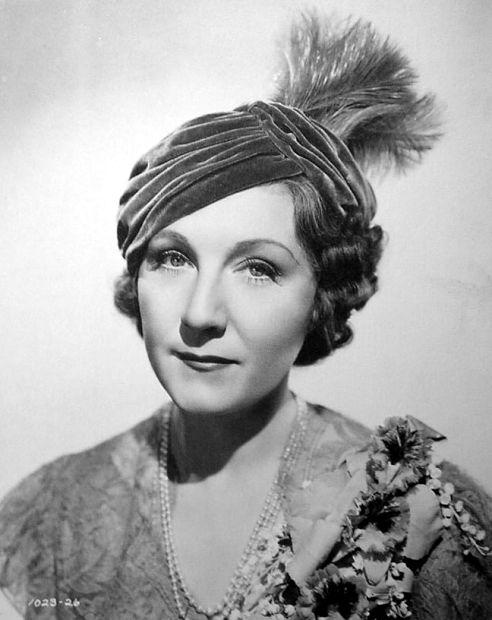
Judith Anderson won the award for Medea (1948)

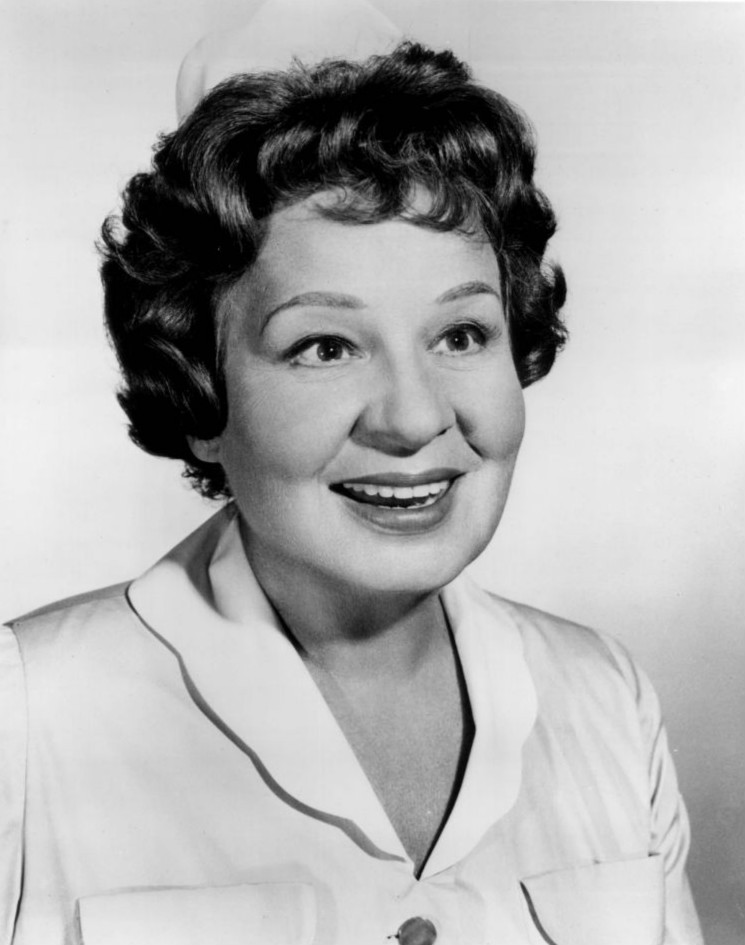
Shirley Booth won this award twice; in 1950 and 1953

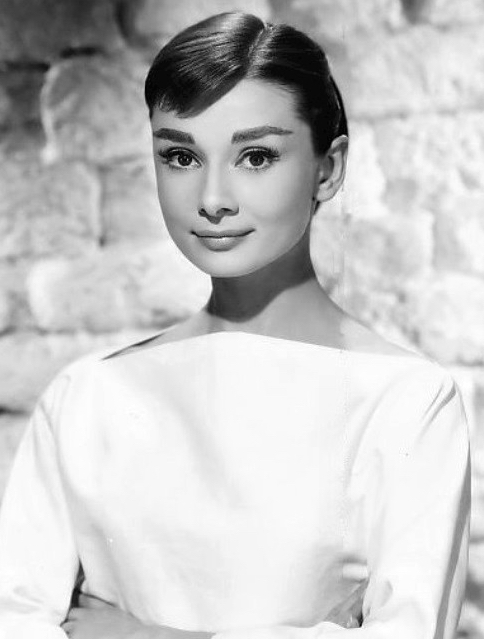
Audrey Hepburn won for Ondine (1954)

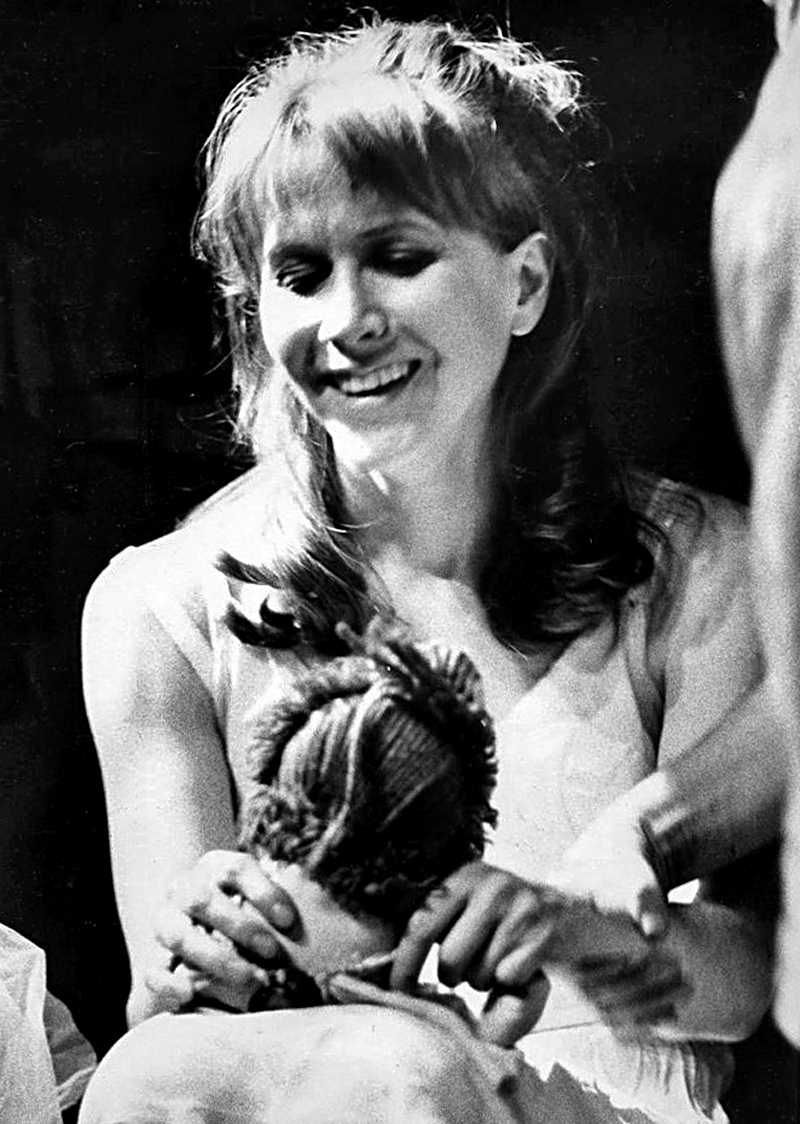
Julie Harris won a record breaking five times in this category

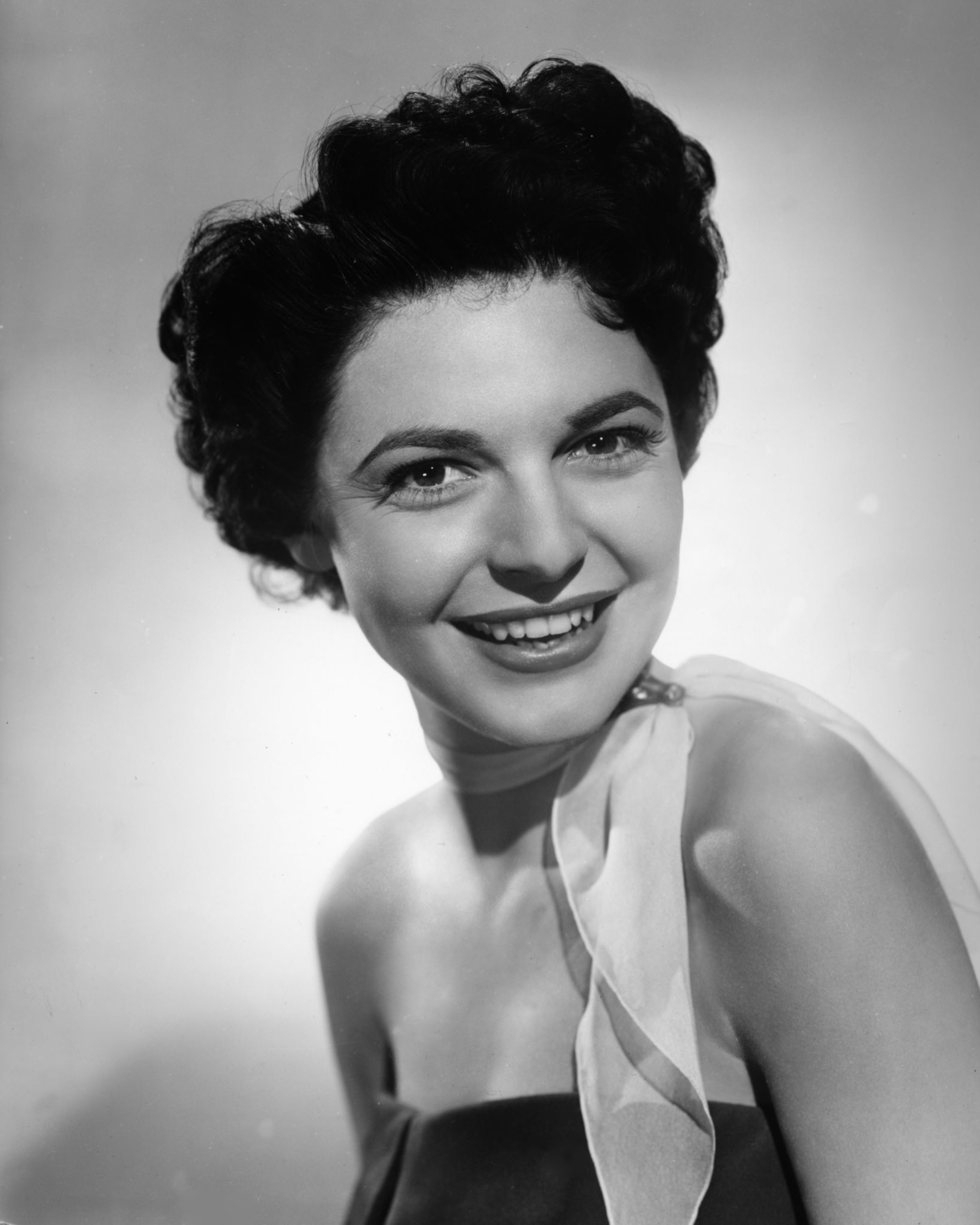
Anne Bancroft won for The Miracle Worker (1960)

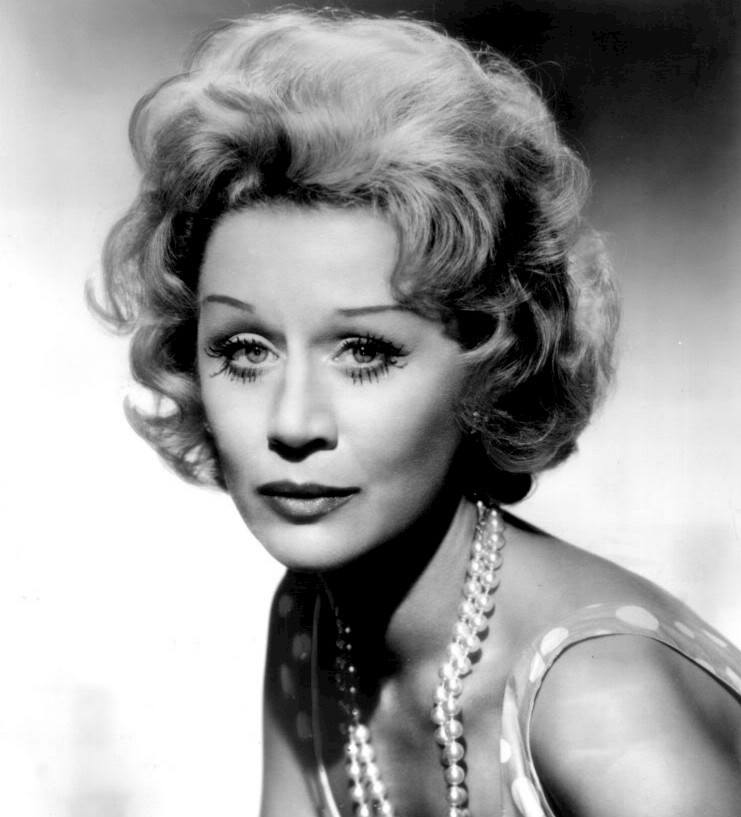
Margaret Leighton won for Night of the Iguana (1962)

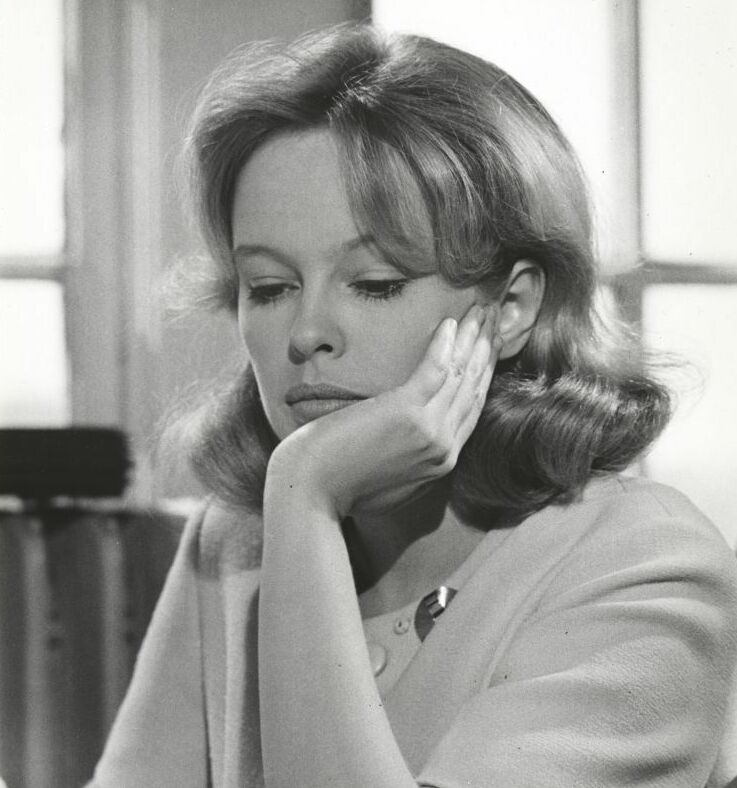
Sandy Dennis won for Ash Wednesday (1964)

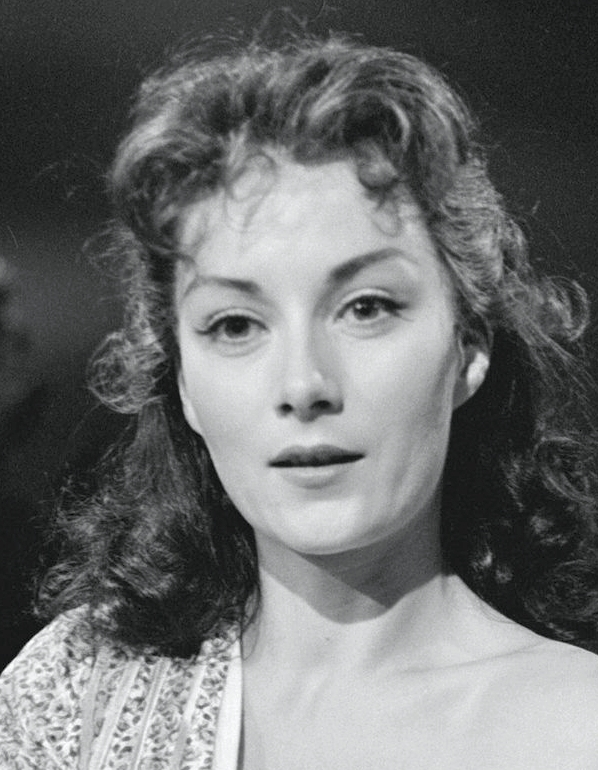
Rosemary Harris won for The Lion in Winter (1965)

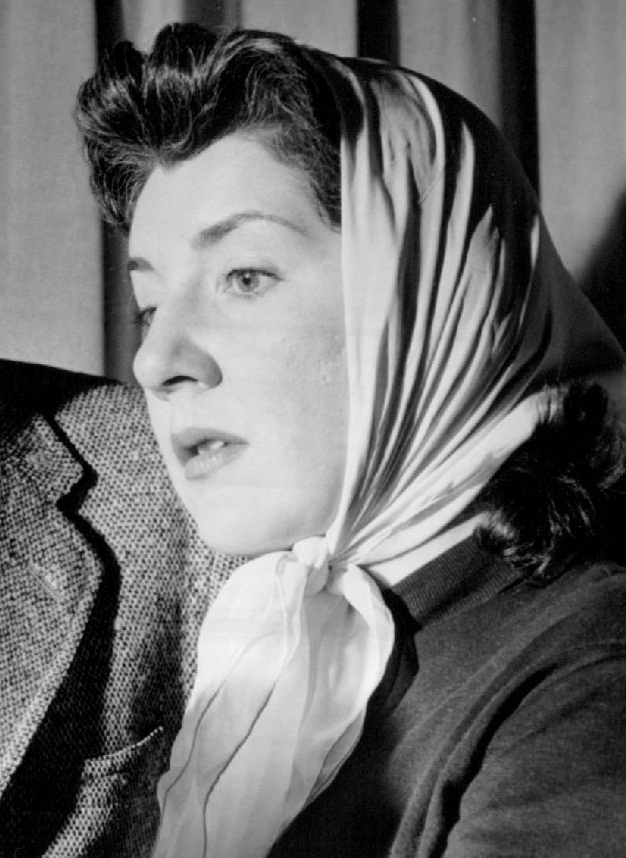
Maureen Stapleton won for The Gingerbread Lady (1971)

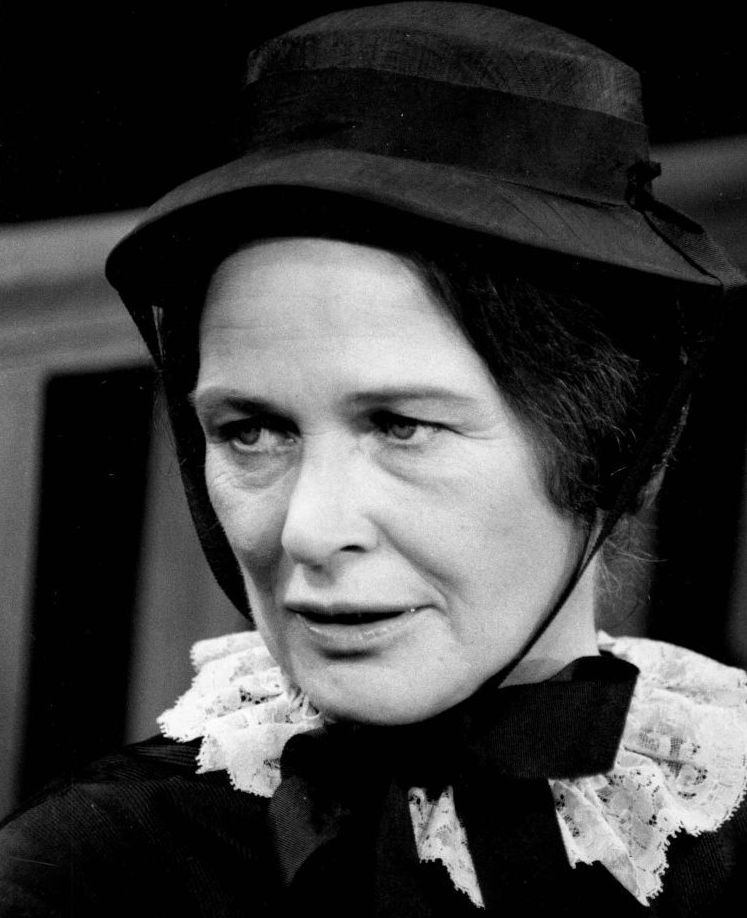
Colleen Dewhurst won for A Moon for the Misbegotten (1973)

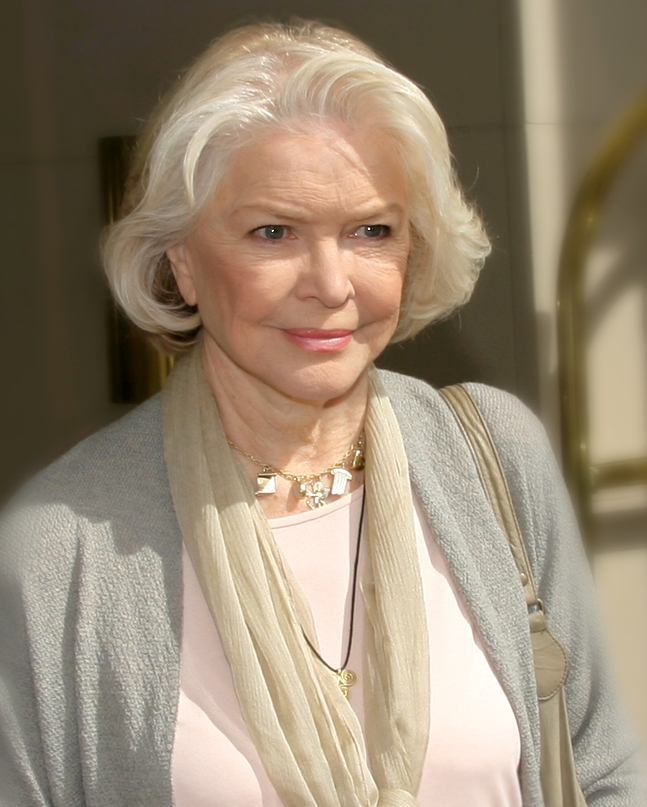
Ellen Burstyn won for Same Time, Next Year (1975)

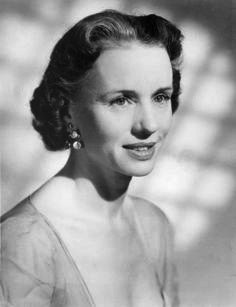
Jessica Tandy won twice in 1978 and 1981

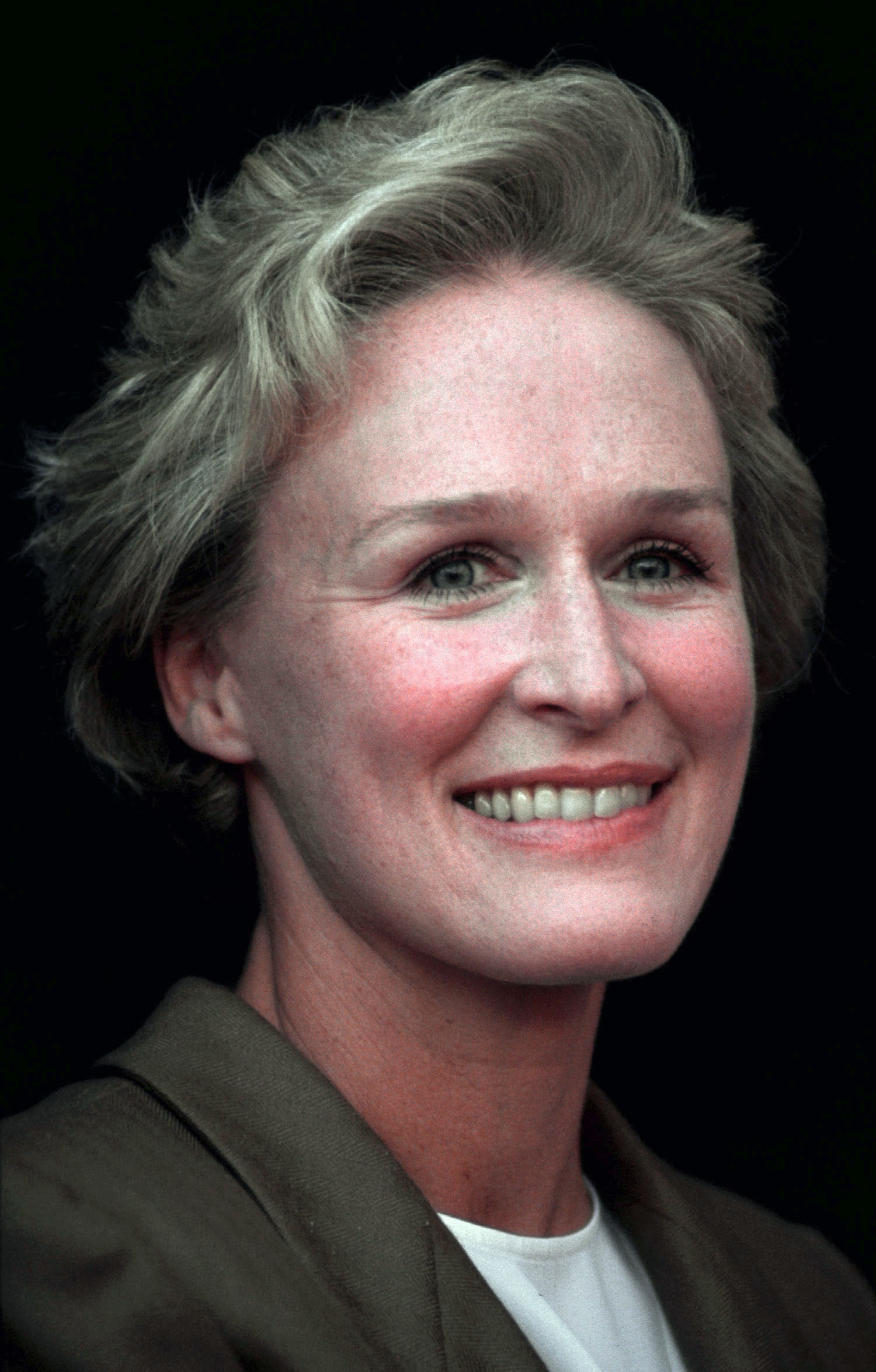
Glenn Close won twice in 1984 and 1992

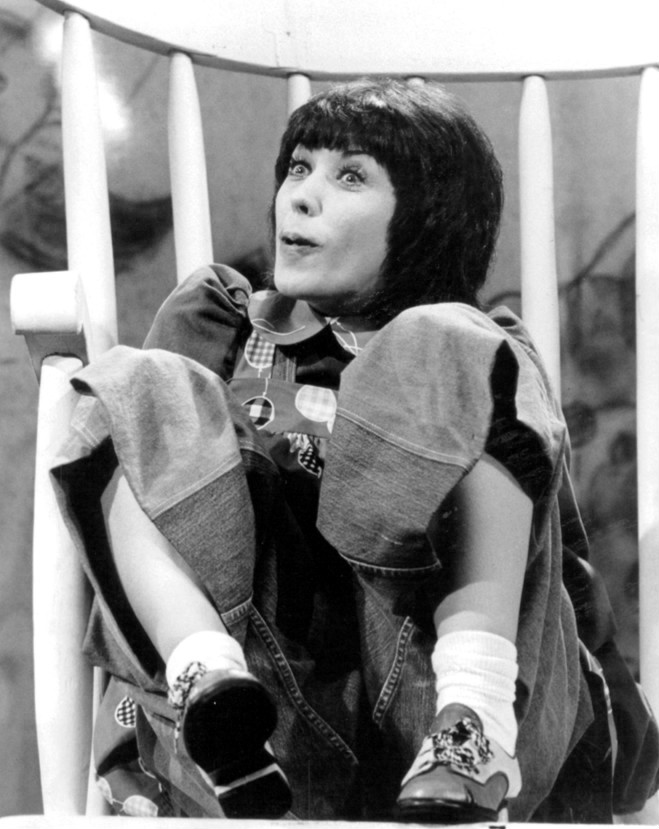
Lily Tomlin won for The Search for Signs of Intelligent Life in the Universe (1986)

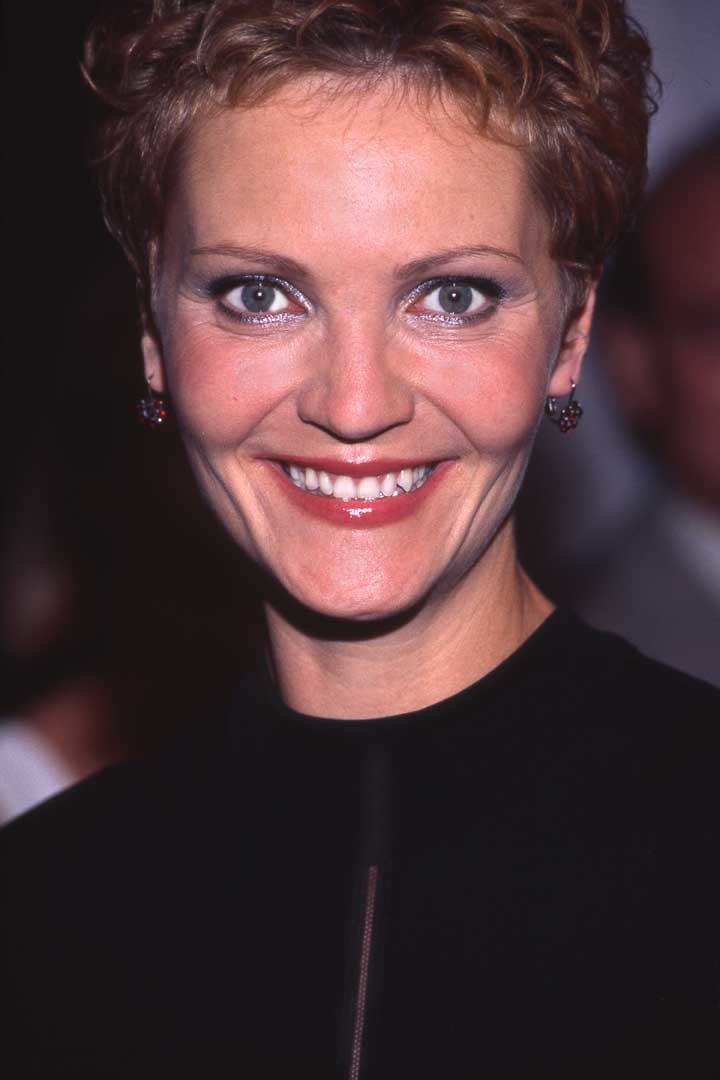
Joan Allen won for Burn This (1988)

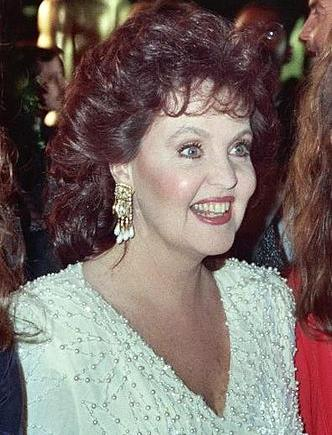
Pauline Collins for Shirley Valentine (1989)

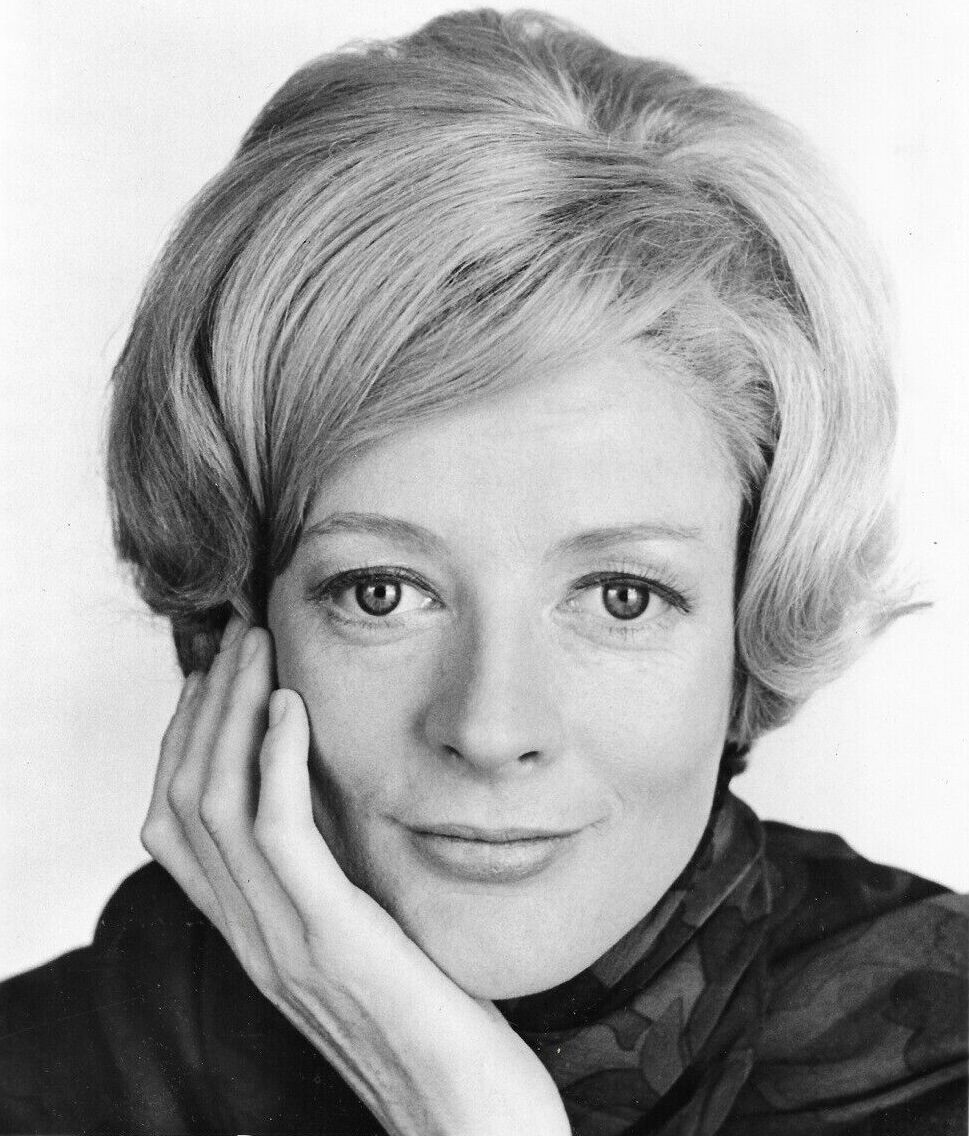
Dame Maggie Smith won for Lettice and Lovage (1990)

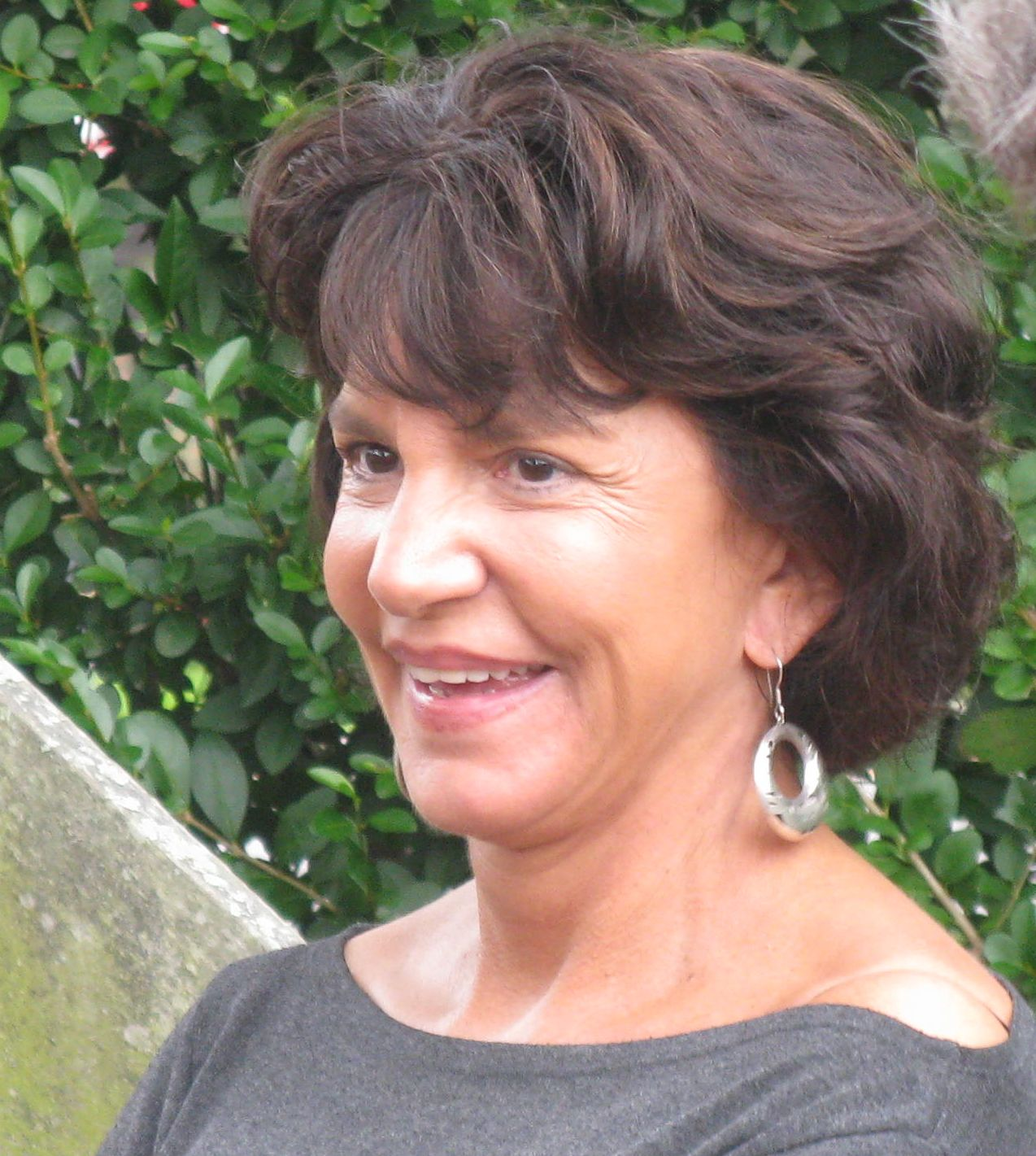
Mercedes Ruehl won for Lost in Yonkers (1991)

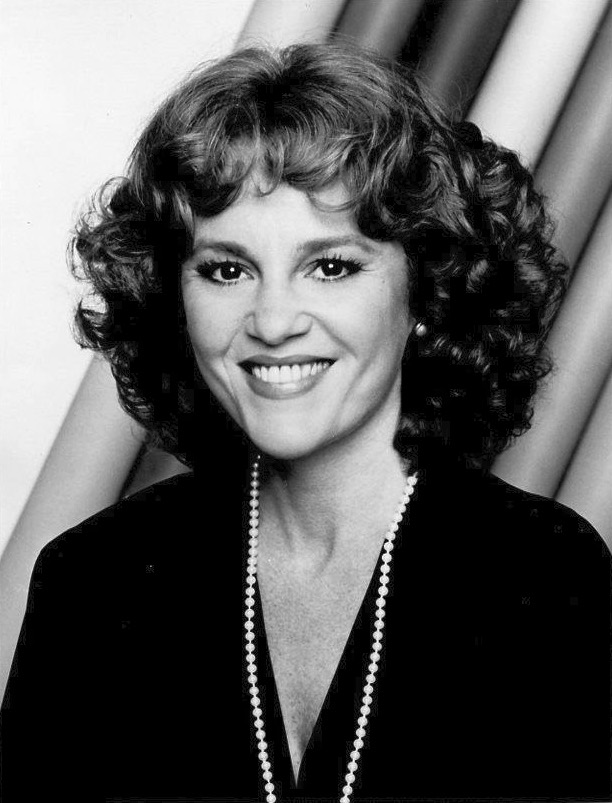
Madeline Kahn won for The Sisters Rosenweig (1993)

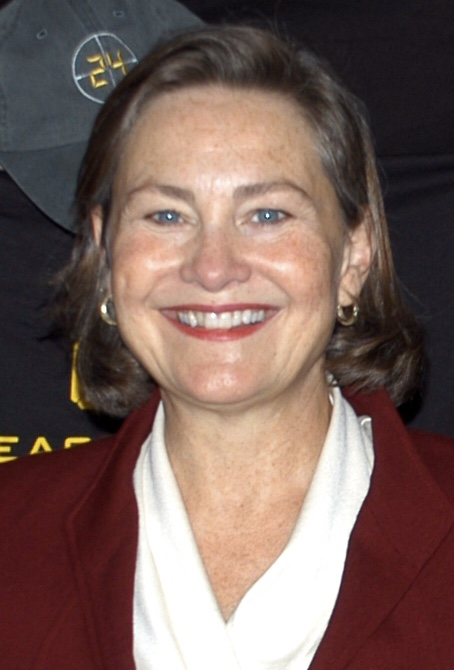
Cherry Jones won twice for The Heiress (1995) and for Doubt (2005)

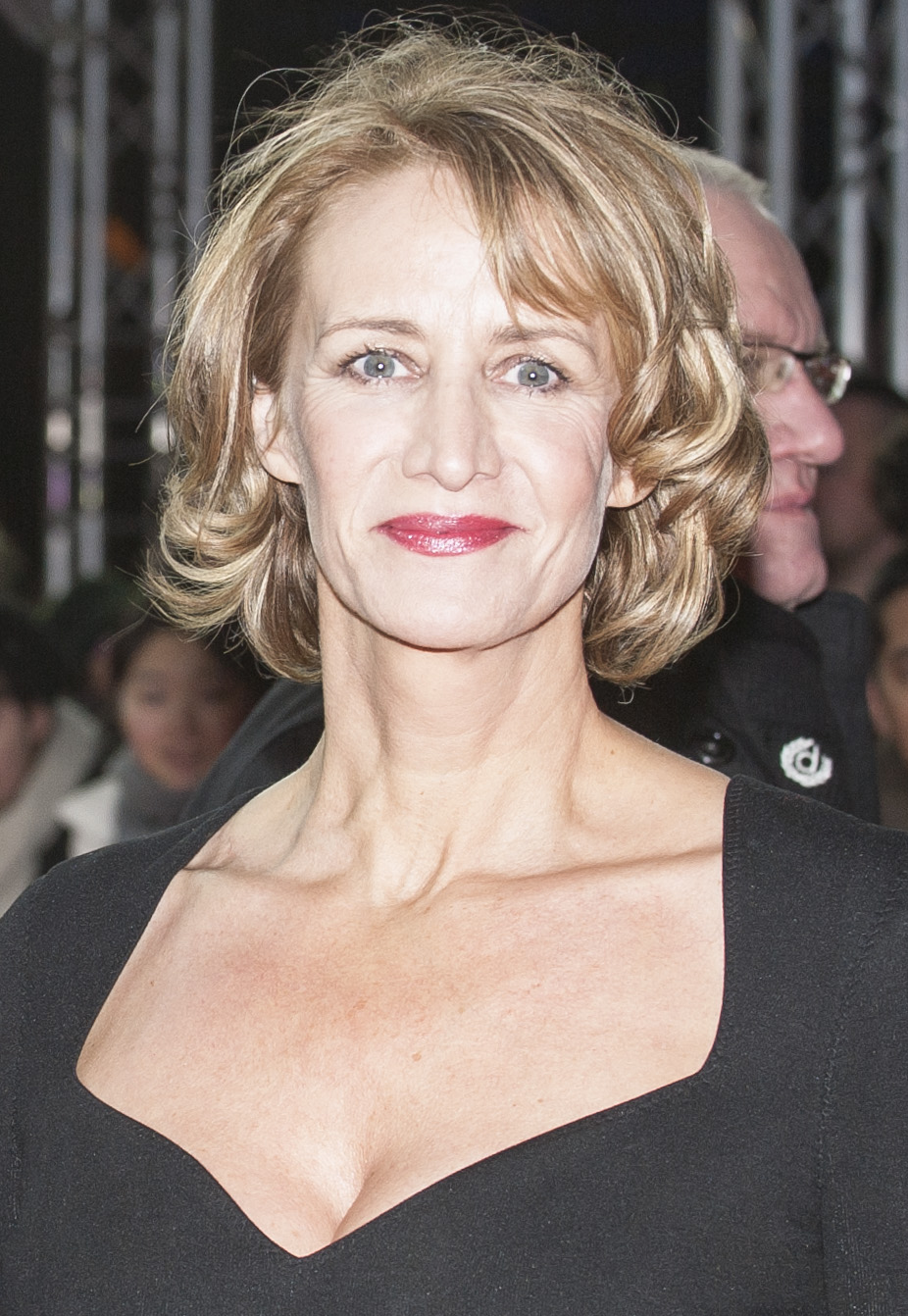
Janet McTeer won for A Doll's House (1997)

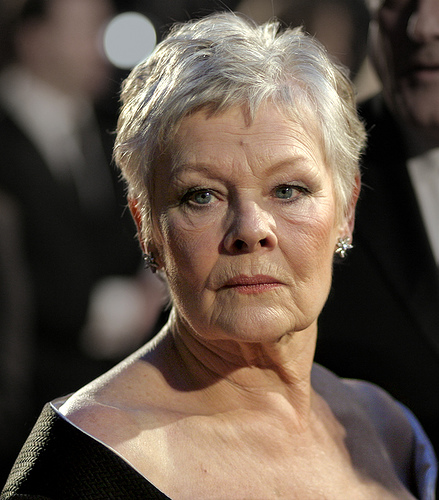
Judi Dench won for Amy's View (1999)

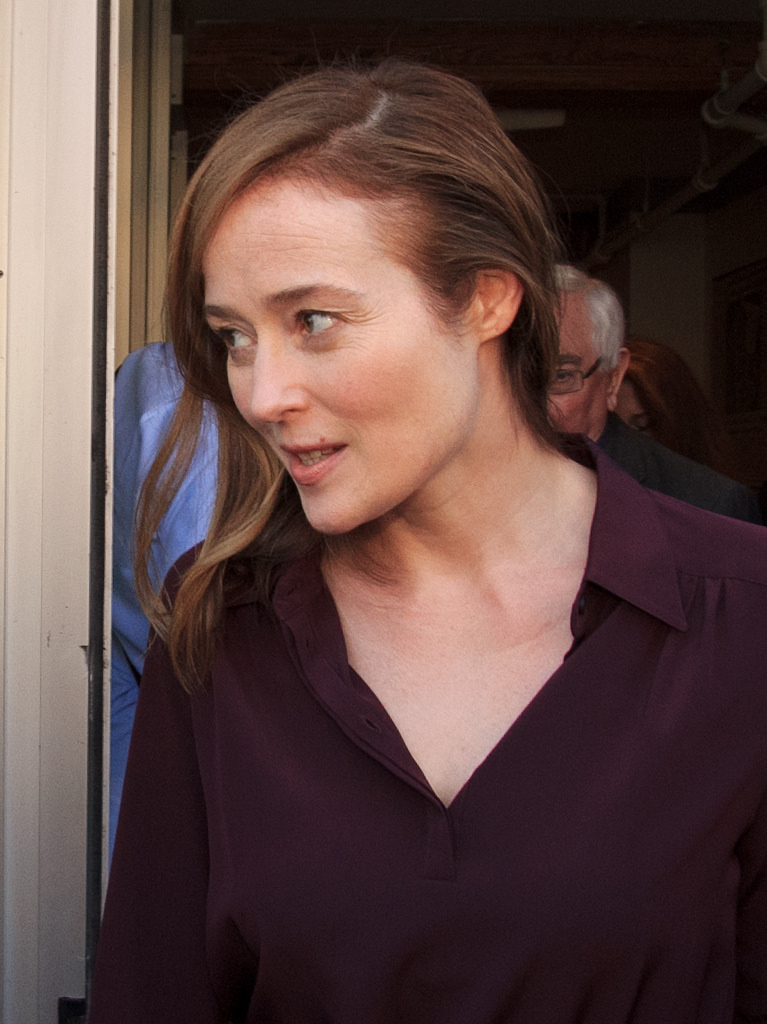
Jennifer Ehle won for The Real Thing (2000)

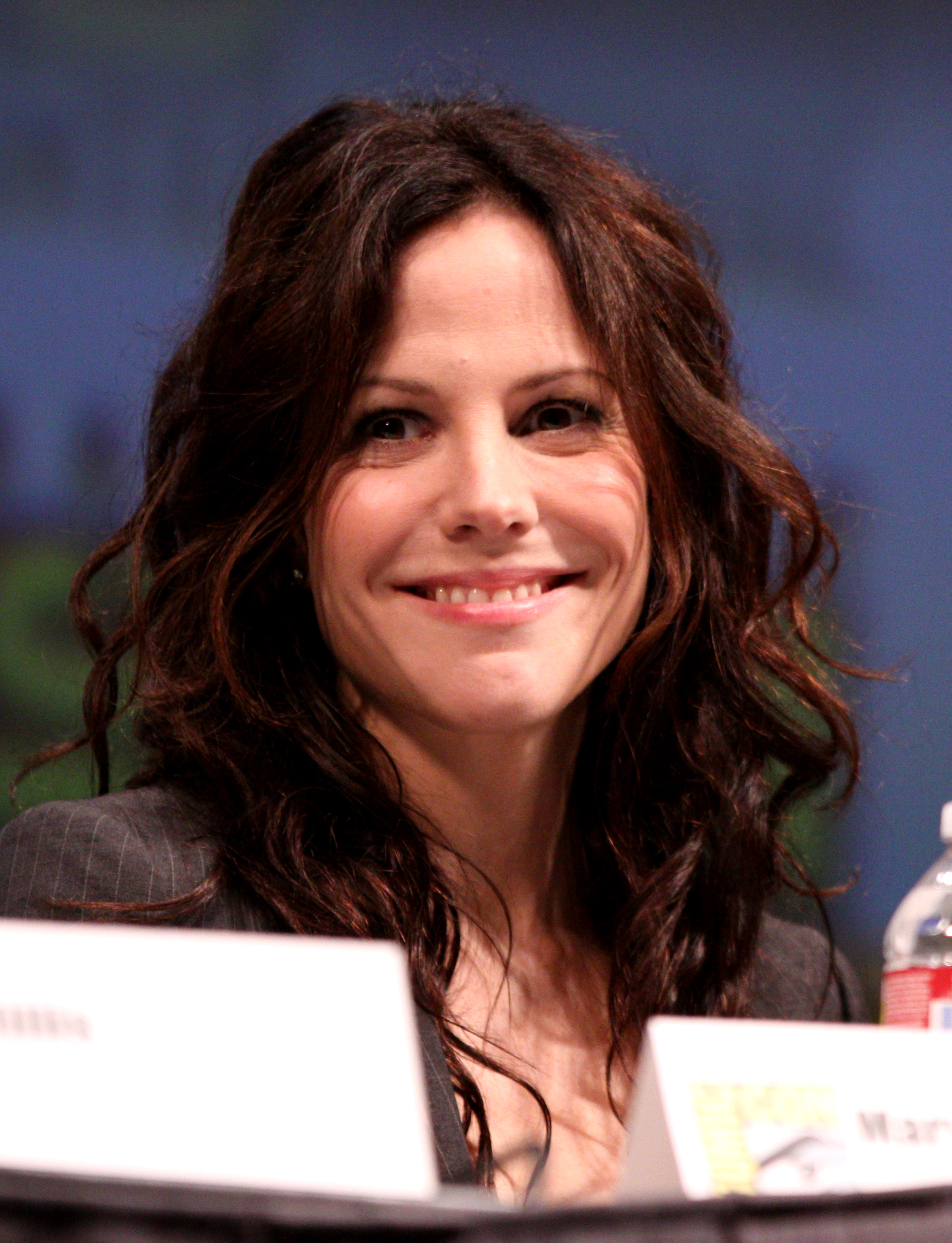
Mary-Louise Parker won twice for Proof (2001) and The Sound Inside (2020)

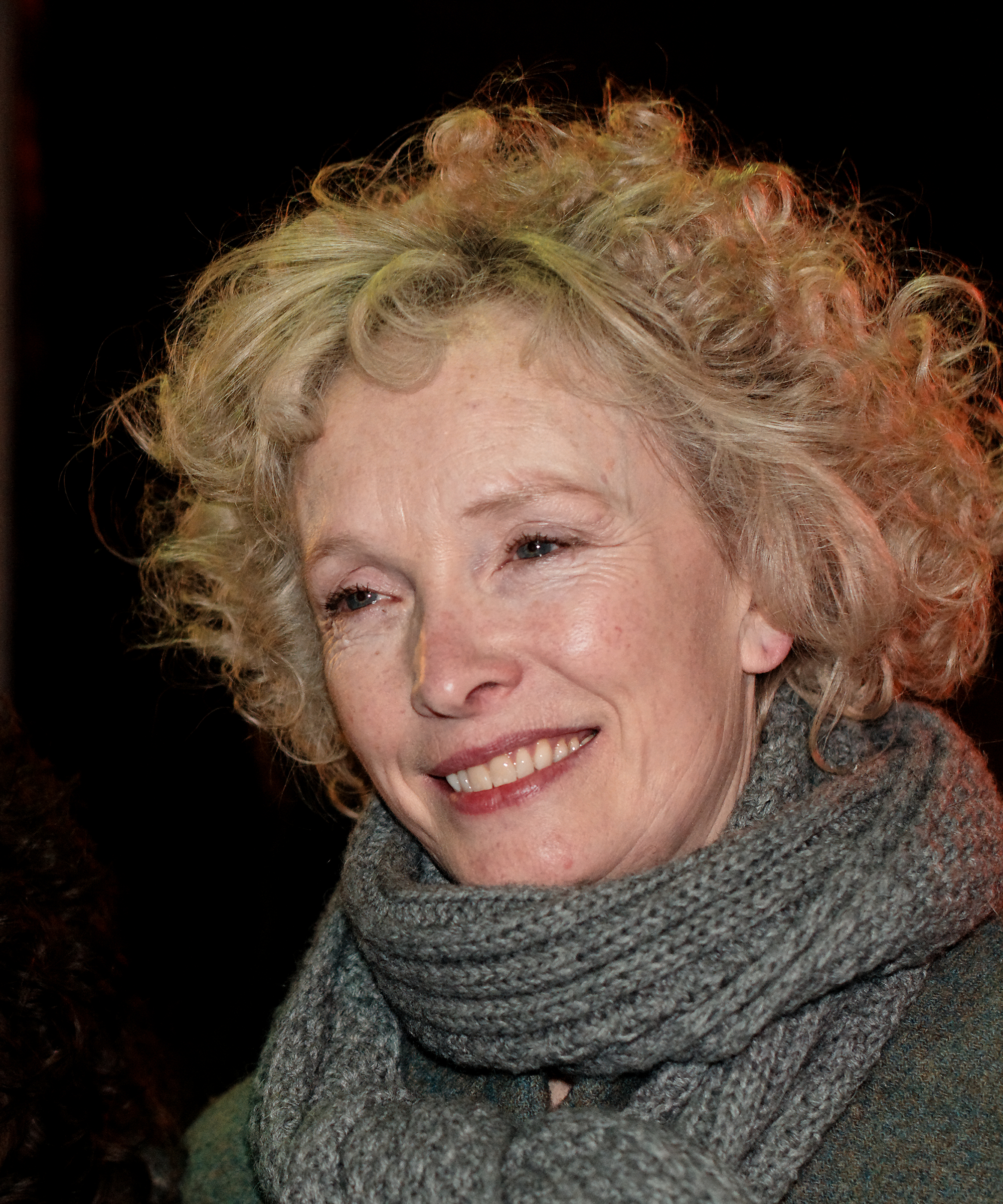
Lindsay Duncan won for Private Lives (2002)

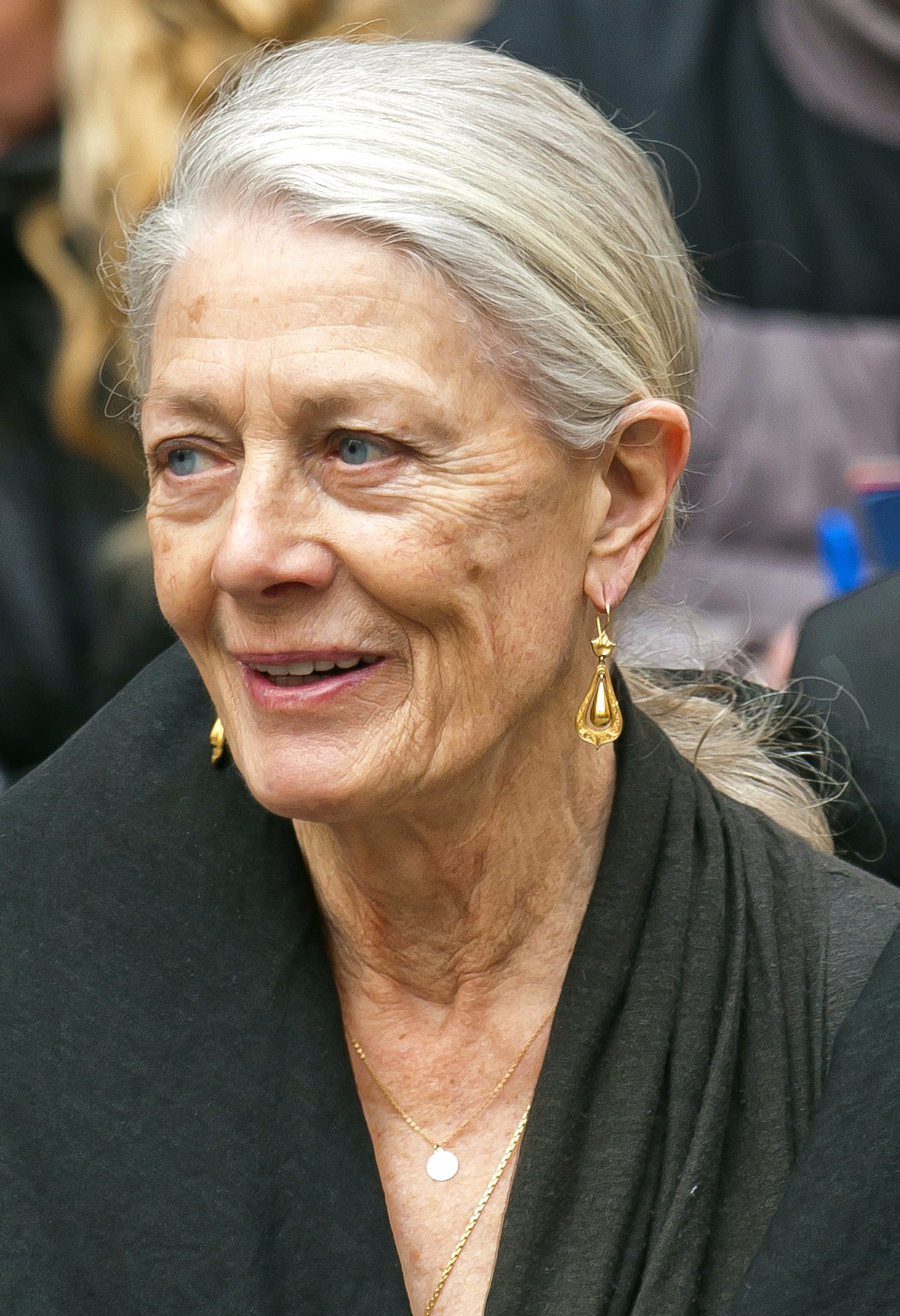
Vanessa Redgrave won for Long Day's Journey into Night (2003)

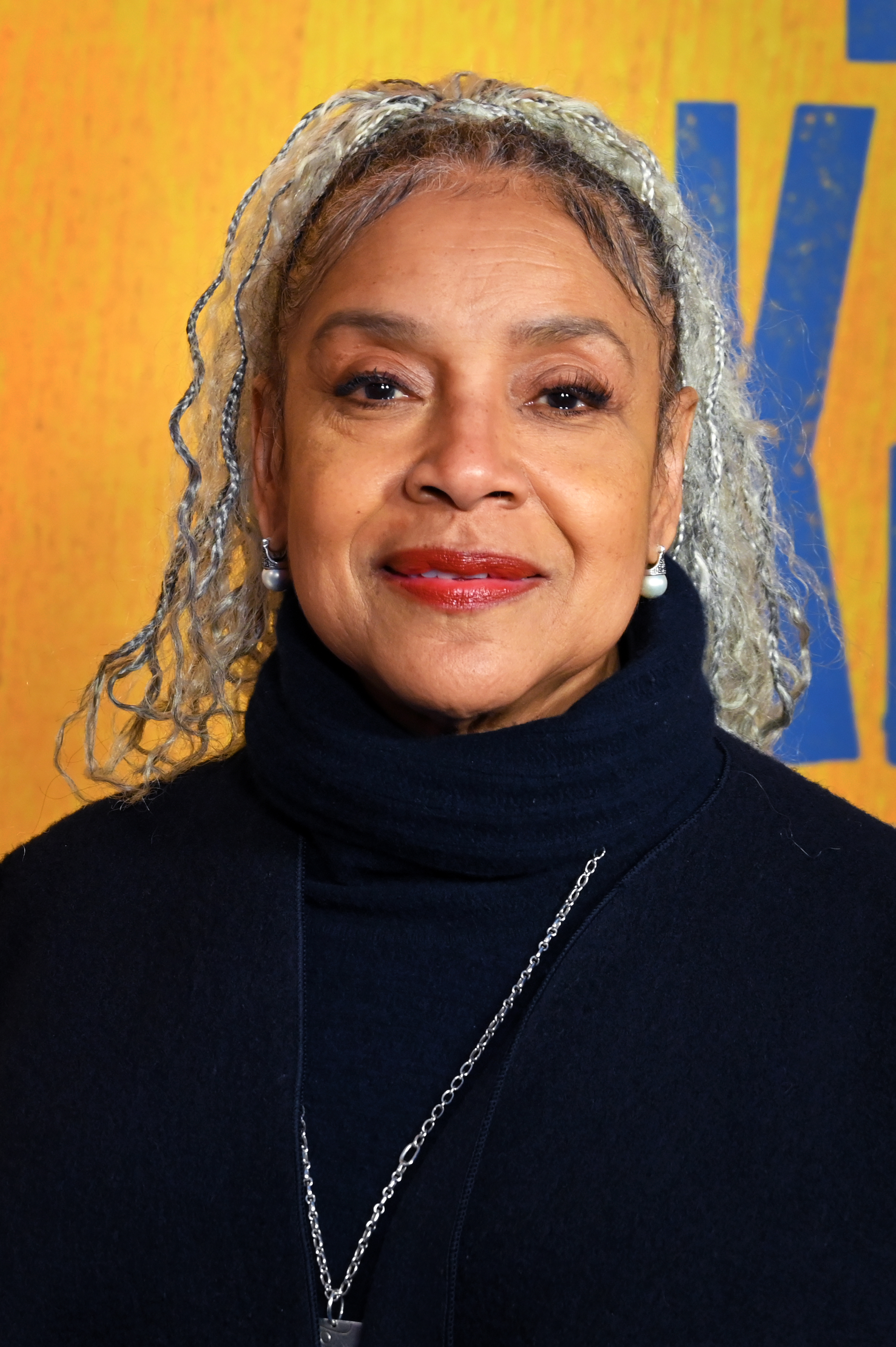
Phylicia Rashad won for Raisin in the Sun (2004)

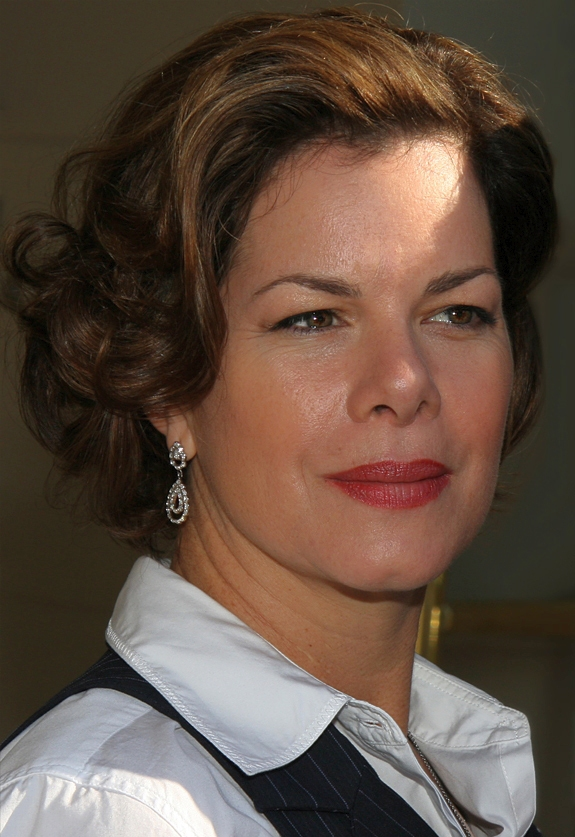
Marcia Gay Harden won for God of Carnage (2009)

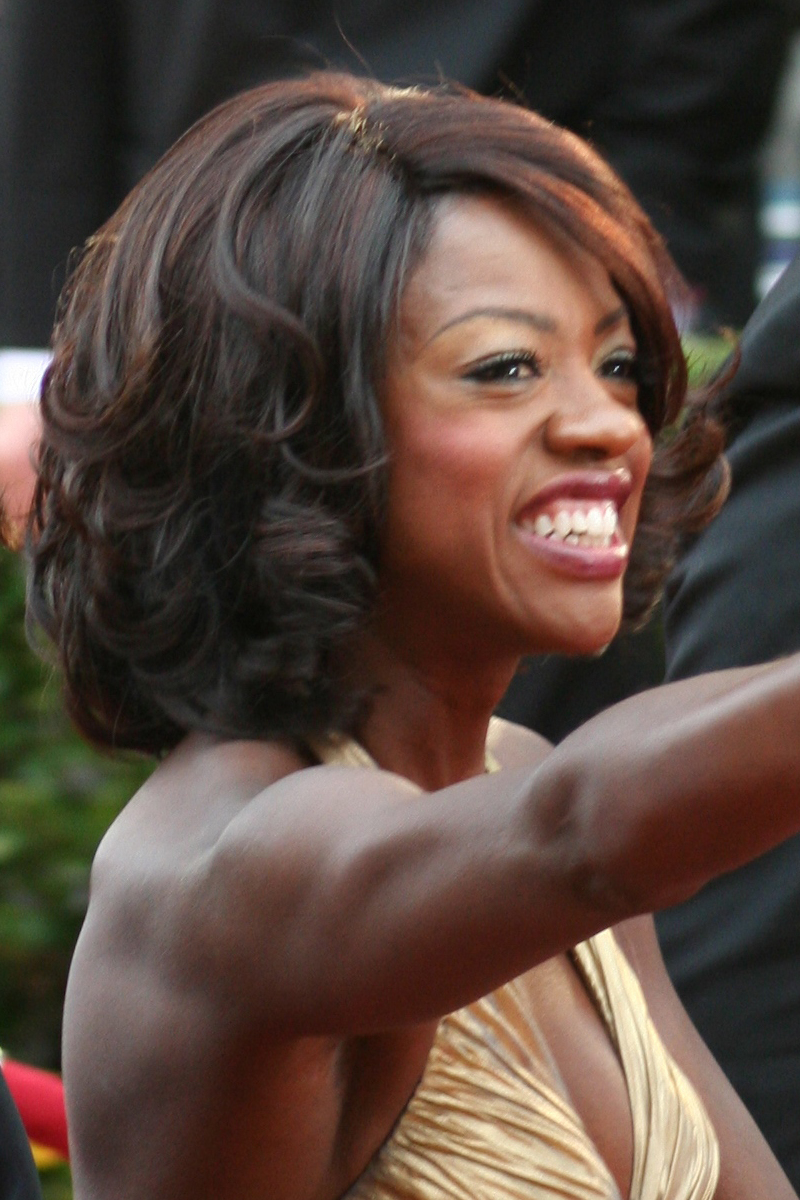
Viola Davis won for Fences (2010)

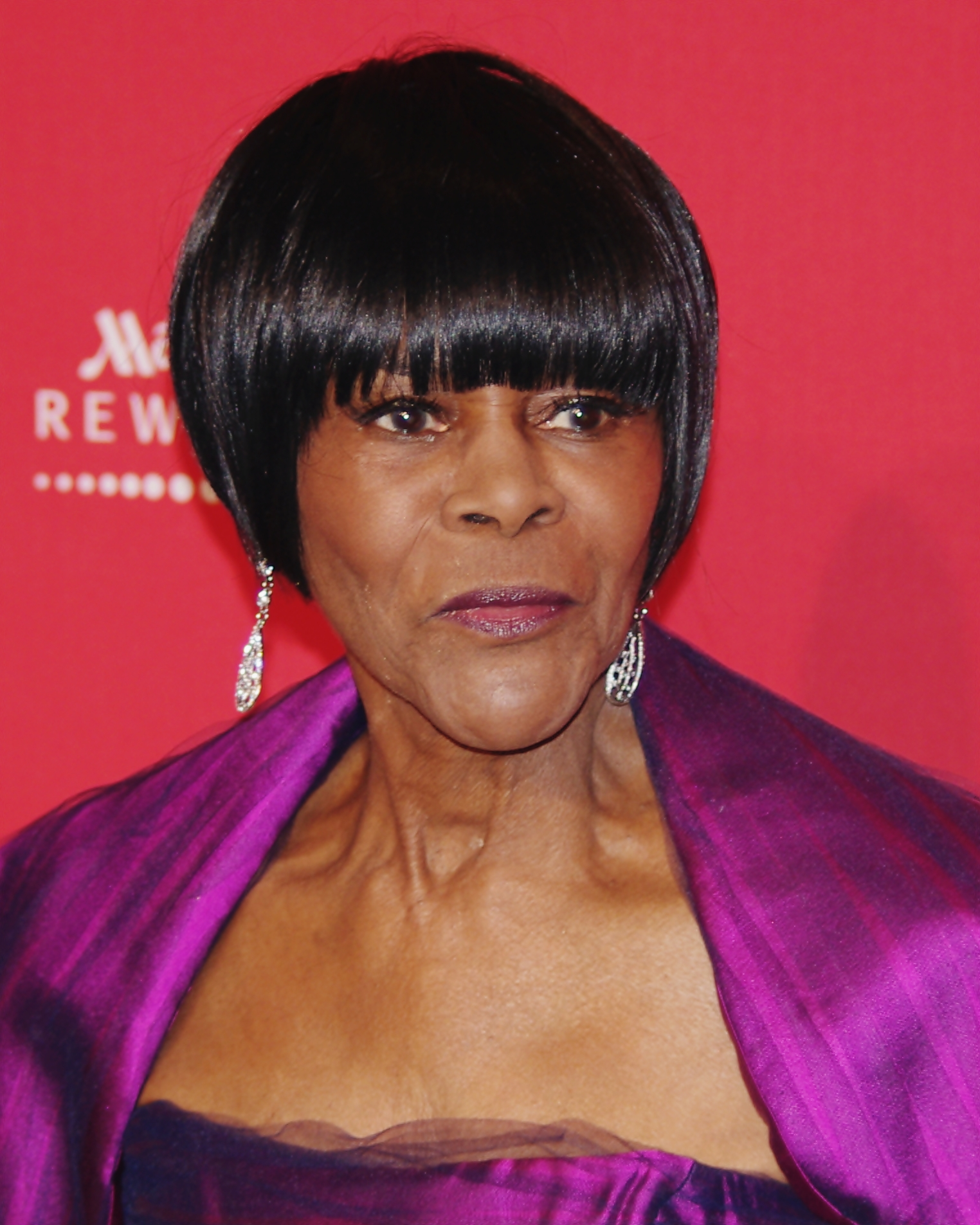
Cicely Tyson, age 91, won for A Trip to Bountiful (2012)

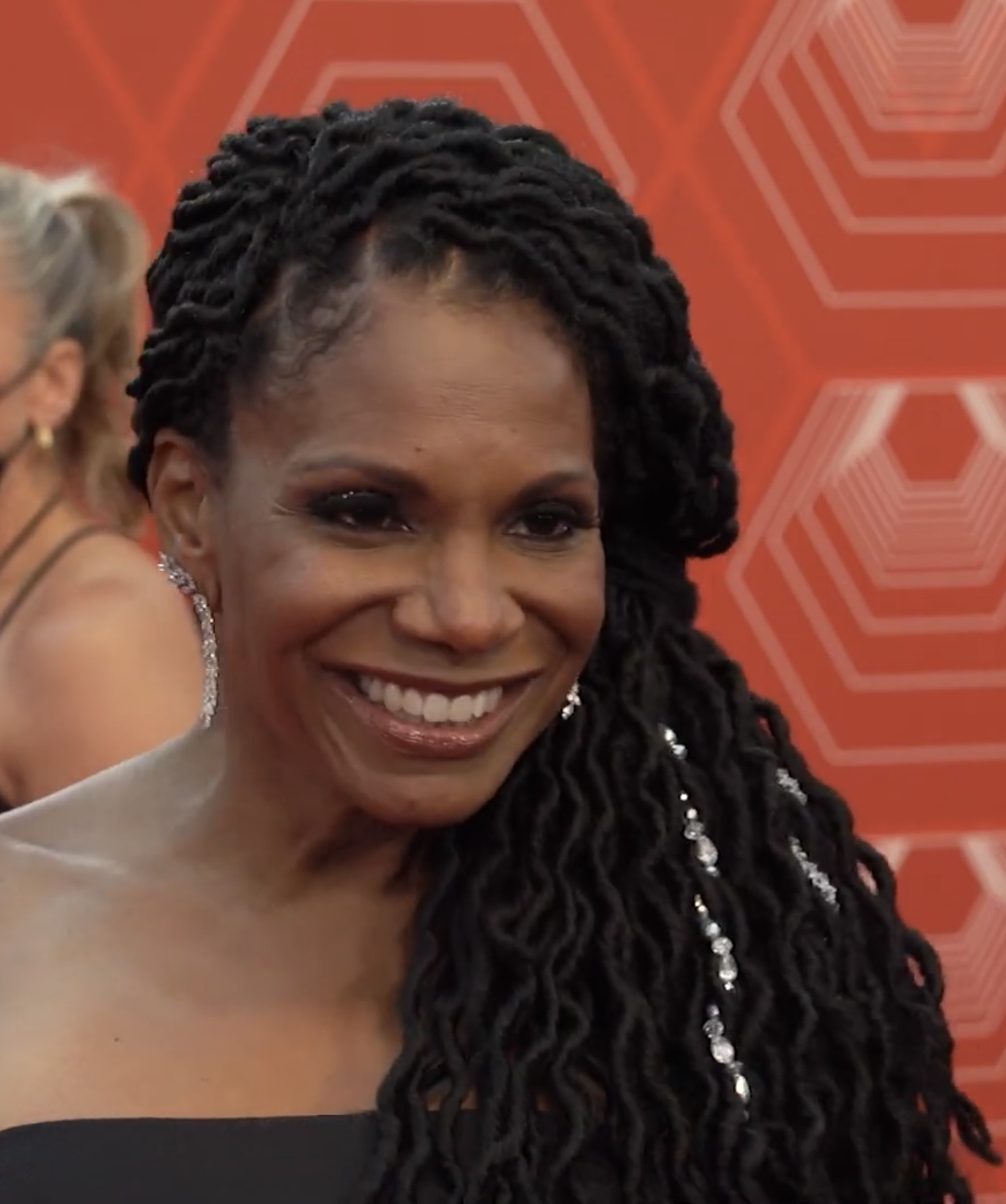
Audra McDonald won for Lady Day at Emerson's Bar and Grill (2014)

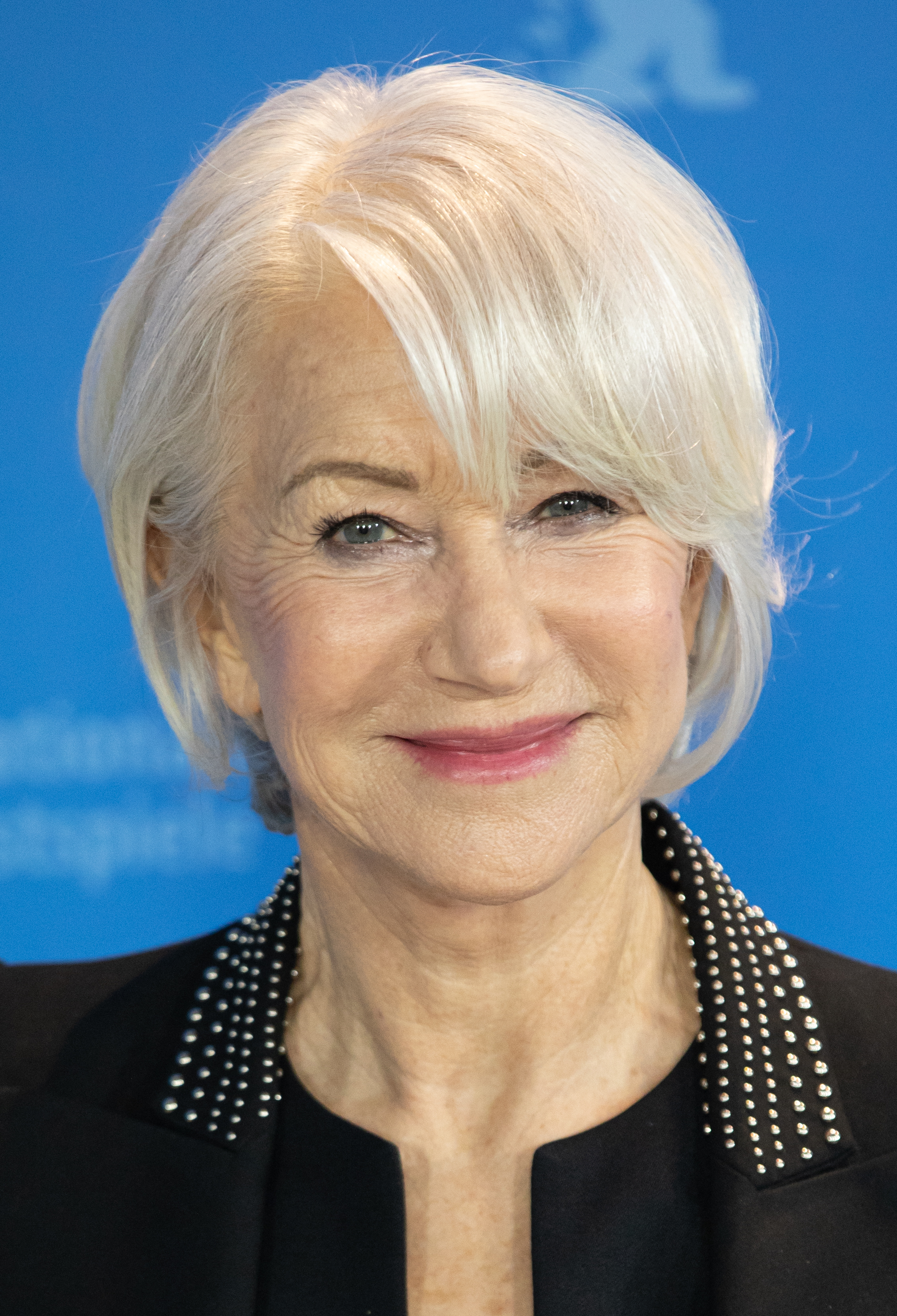
Dame Helen Mirren won for The Audience (2015)

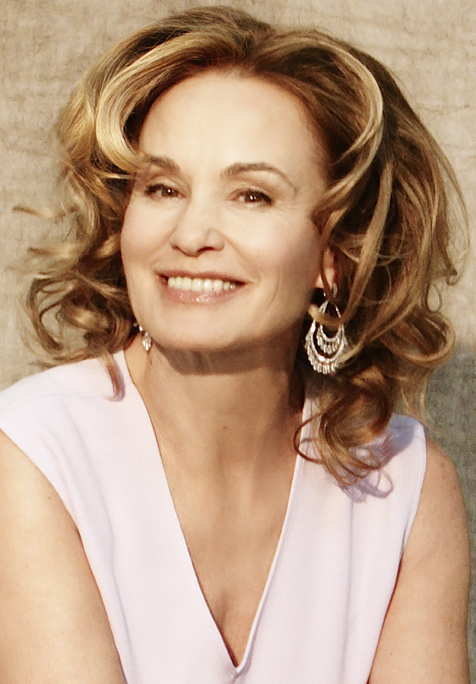
Jessica Lange won for Long Day's Journey into Night (2016)

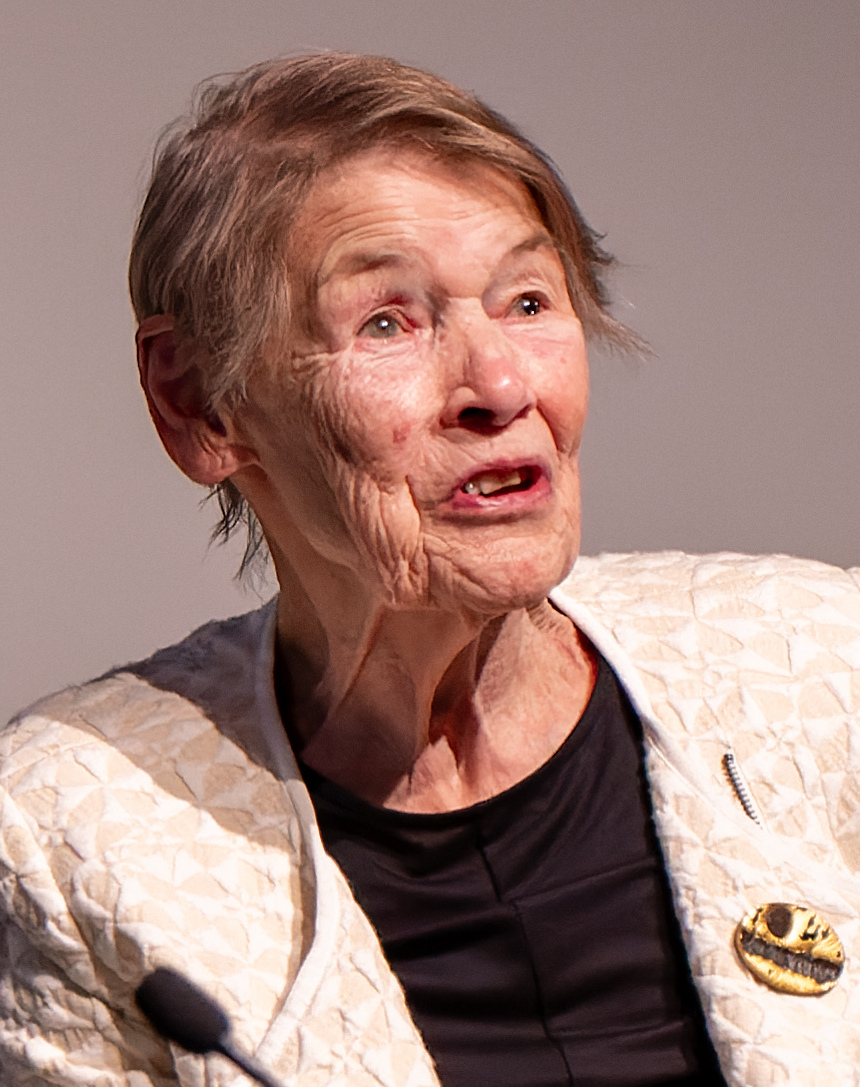
Glenda Jackson won for Three Tall Women (2018)

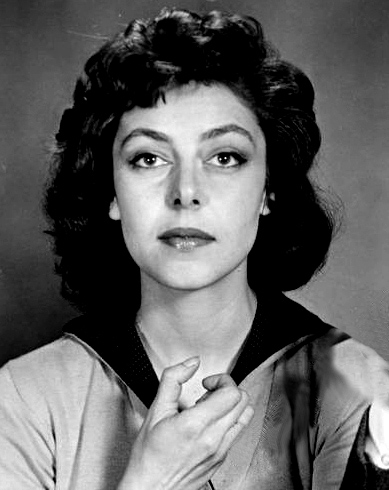
Elaine May won for The Waverly Gallery (2019)

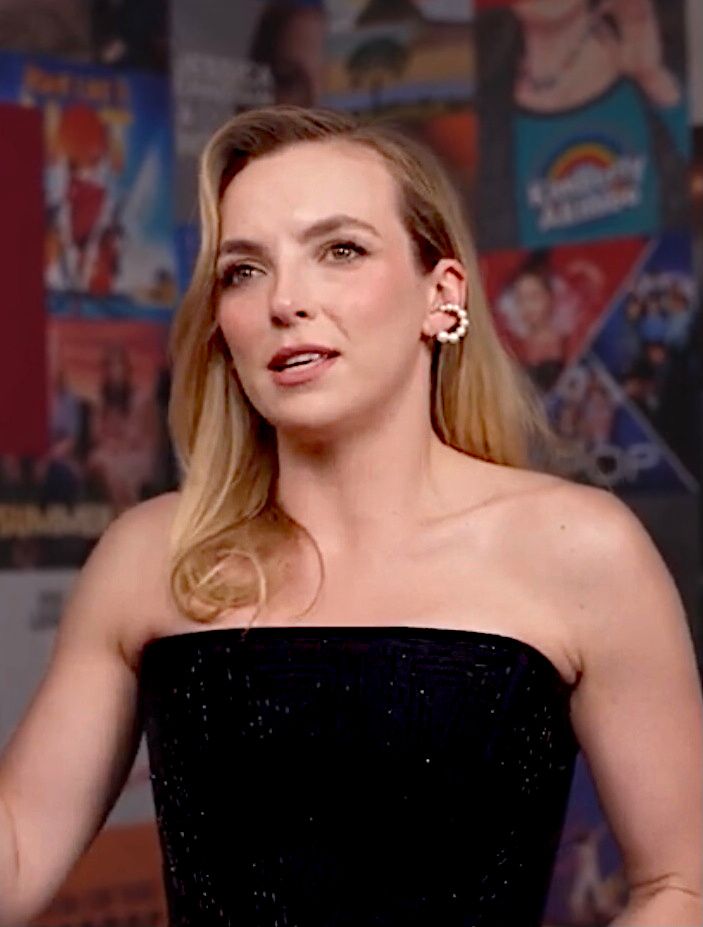
Jodie Comer won for Prima Facie (2023)

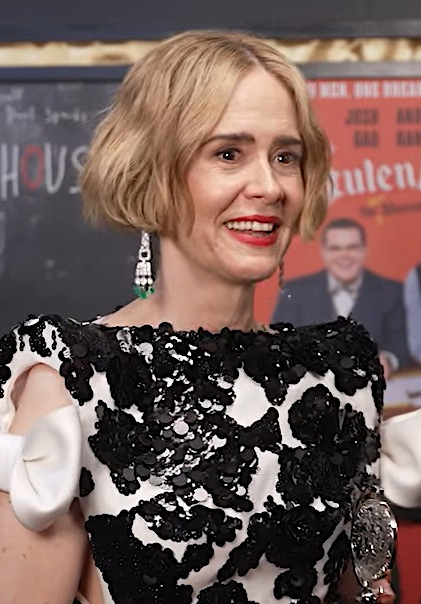
Sarah Paulson won for Appropriate (2024)

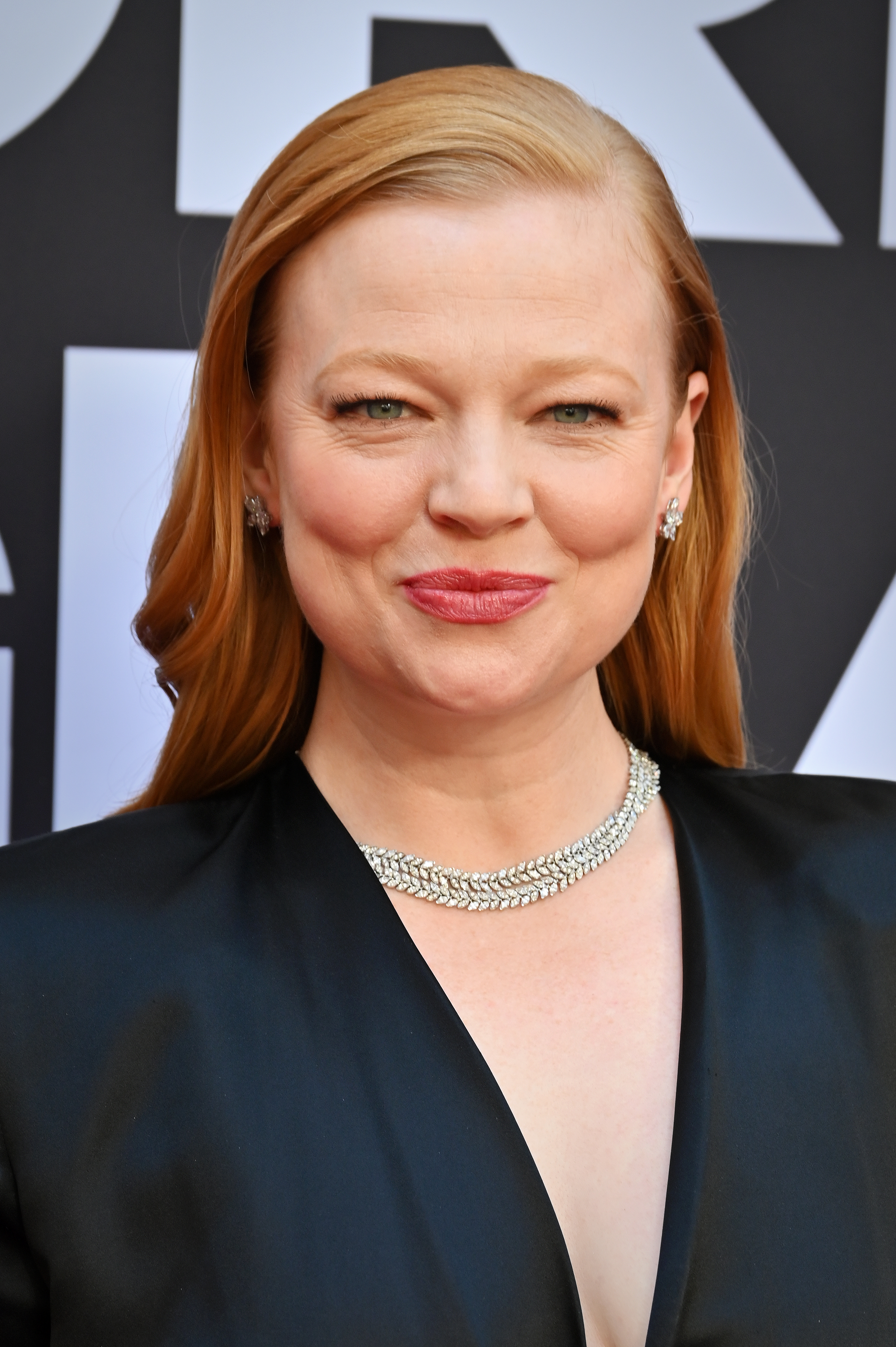
Sarah Snook won for The Picture of Dorian Gray (2025)

=== 1940s ===
Year	Actress	Play	Role(s)	Ref.
1947 (1st)
1947 (1st)	Ingrid Bergman	Joan of Lorraine	Mary Grey / Joan of Arc	
1947 (1st)	Helen Hayes	Happy Birthday	Addie Bemis	
1948 (2nd)
1948 (2nd)	Judith Anderson	Medea	Medea	
1948 (2nd)	Katharine Cornell	Antony and Cleopatra	Cleopatra	
1948 (2nd)	Jessica Tandy	A Streetcar Named Desire	Blanche DuBois	
1949 (3rd)	Martita Hunt	The Madwoman of Chaillot	Countess Aurelia	

=== 1950s ===
Year	Actress	Play	Role(s)	Ref.
1950 (4th)
1950 (4th)	Shirley Booth	Come Back, Little Sheba	Lola Delaney	
1951 (5th)
1951 (5th)	Uta Hagen	The Country Girl	Georgie Elgin	
1952 (6th)
1952 (6th)	Julie Harris	I Am a Camera	Sally Bowles	
1953 (7th)
1953 (7th)	Shirley Booth	The Time of the Cuckoo	Leona Samish	
1954 (8th)
1954 (8th)	Audrey Hepburn	Ondine	Ondine	
1955 (9th)
1955 (9th)	Nancy Kelly	The Bad Seed	Christine Penmark	
1956 (10th)
1956 (10th)	Julie Harris	The Lark	Joan of Arc	
1956 (10th)	Barbara Bel Geddes	Cat on a Hot Tin Roof	Maggie Pollitt	
1956 (10th)	Gladys Cooper	The Chalk Garden	Mrs. St. Maugham	
1956 (10th)	Ruth Gordon	The Matchmaker	Dolly Gallagher Levi	
1956 (10th)	Siobhán McKenna	The Chalk Garden	Miss Madrigal	
1956 (10th)	Susan Strasberg	The Diary of Anne Frank	Anne Frank	
1957 (11th)
1957 (11th)	Margaret Leighton	Separate Tables	Ann Shankland / Sibyl Railton-Bell	
1957 (11th)	Florence Eldridge	Long Day's Journey into Night	Mary Cavan Tyrone	
1957 (11th)	Rosalind Russell	Auntie Mame	Mame Dennis	
1957 (11th)	Sybil Thorndike	The Potting Shed	Mrs. Callifer	
1958 (12th)
1958 (12th)	Helen Hayes	Time Remembered	The Duchess of Pont-Au-Bronc	
1958 (12th)	Wendy Hiller	A Moon for the Misbegotten	Josie Hogan	
1958 (12th)	Siobhán McKenna	The Rope Dancers	Margaret Hyland	
1958 (12th)	Eugenie Leontovich	The Cave Dwellers	The Queen	
1958 (12th)	Mary Ure	Look Back in Anger	Alison Porter	
1958 (12th)	Jo Van Fleet	Look Homeward, Angel	Eliza Gant	
1959 (13th)
1959 (13th)	Gertrude Berg	A Majority of One	Bertha Jacoby	
1959 (13th)	Claudette Colbert	The Marriage-Go-Round	Content Lowell	
1959 (13th)	Lynn Fontanne	The Visit	Claire Zachanassian	
1959 (13th)	Kim Stanley	A Touch of the Poet	Sara Melody	
1959 (13th)	Maureen Stapleton	The Cold Wind And The Warm	Aunt Ida	

=== 1960s ===
Year	Actress	Play	Role(s)	Ref.
1960 (14th)
1960 (14th)	Anne Bancroft	The Miracle Worker	Annie Sullivan	
1960 (14th)	Margaret Leighton	Much Ado About Nothing	Beatrice	
1960 (14th)	Claudia McNeil	A Raisin in the Sun	Lena Younger	
1960 (14th)	Geraldine Page	Sweet Bird of Youth	Alexandra Del Lago	
1960 (14th)	Maureen Stapleton	Toys in the Attic	Carrie Berniers	
1960 (14th)	Irene Worth	Toys in the Attic	Albertine Prine	
1961 (15th)
1961 (15th)	Joan Plowright	A Taste of Honey	Josephine	
1961 (15th)	Tallulah Bankhead	Midgie Purvis	Midgie Purvis	
1961 (15th)	Barbara Baxley	Period of Adjustment	Isabel Haverstick	
1961 (15th)	Barbara Bel Geddes	Mary, Mary	Mary McKellaway	
1962 (16th)
1962 (16th)	Margaret Leighton	The Night of the Iguana	Hannah Jelkes	
1962 (16th)	Gladys Cooper	A Passage to India	Mrs. Moore	
1962 (16th)	Colleen Dewhurst	Great Day in the Morning	Phoebe Flaherty	
1962 (16th)	Kim Stanley	A Far Country	Elizabeth von Ritter	
1963 (17th)
1963 (17th)	Uta Hagen	Who's Afraid of Virginia Woolf?	Martha	
1963 (17th)	Hermione Baddeley	The Milk Train Doesn't Stop Here Anymore	Flora Goforth	
1963 (17th)	Margaret Leighton	Tchin-Tchin	Pamela Pew-Pickett	
1963 (17th)	Claudia McNeil	Tiger, Tiger Burning Bright	Mama Morris	
1964 (18th)
1964 (18th)	Sandy Dennis	Any Wednesday	Ellen Gordon	
1964 (18th)	Elizabeth Ashley	Barefoot in the Park	Corie Bratter	
1964 (18th)	Colleen Dewhurst	The Ballad of the Sad Café	Amelia Evans	
1964 (18th)	Julie Harris	Marathon '33	June Havoc	
1965 (19th)
1965 (19th)	Irene Worth	Tiny Alice	Miss Alice	
1965 (19th)	Marjorie Rhodes	All in Good Time	Lucy Fitton	
1965 (19th)	Beah Richards	The Amen Corner	Sister Margaret Alexander	
1965 (19th)	Diana Sands	The Owl and the Pussycat	Doris	
1966 (20th)
1966 (20th)	Rosemary Harris	The Lion in Winter	Eleanor of Aquitaine	
1966 (20th)	Sheila Hancock	Entertaining Mr Sloane	Kath	
1966 (20th)	Kate Reid	Slapstick Tragedy	Celeste/Molly	
1966 (20th)	Lee Remick	Wait Until Dark	Susy Hendrix	
1967 (21st)
1967 (21st)	Beryl Reid	The Killing of Sister George	Sister George / June Buckridge	
1967 (21st)	Eileen Atkins	The Killing of Sister George	Childie / Alice McNaught	
1967 (21st)	Vivien Merchant	The Homecoming	Ruth	
1967 (21st)	Rosemary Murphy	A Delicate Balance	Claire	
1968 (22nd)
1968 (22nd)	Zoe Caldwell	The Prime of Miss Jean Brodie	Jean Brodie	
1968 (22nd)	Colleen Dewhurst	More Stately Mansions	Sara (Melody) Harford	
1968 (22nd)	Maureen Stapleton	Plaza Suite	Karen Nash / Murial Tate / Norma Hubley	
1968 (22nd)	Dorothy Tutin	Portrait of a Queen	Queen Victoria	
1969 (23rd)
1969 (23rd)	Julie Harris	Forty Carats	Ann Stanley	
1969 (23rd)	Estelle Parsons	The Seven Descents of Myrtle	Myrtle	
1969 (23rd)	Charlotte Rae	Morning, Noon and Night	Gertrude / Beryl / Filigree Bones	
1969 (23rd)	Brenda Vaccaro	The Goodbye People	Nancy (Silverman) Scott	

=== 1970s ===
Year	Actress	Play	Role(s)	Ref.
1970 (24th)
1970 (24th)	Tammy Grimes	Private Lives	Amanda Prynne	
1970 (24th)	Geraldine Brooks	Brightower	Sara Brightower	
1970 (24th)	Helen Hayes	Harvey	Veta Louise Simmons	
1971 (25th)
1971 (25th)	Maureen Stapleton	The Gingerbread Lady	Evy Meara	
1971 (25th)	Estelle Parsons	And Miss Reardon Drinks A Little	Catherine Reardon	
1971 (25th)	Diana Rigg	Abelard and Heloise	Héloïse	
1971 (25th)	Marian Seldes	Father's Day	Marian	
1972 (26th)
1972 (26th)	Sada Thompson	Twigs	Ma / Dorothy / Celia / Emily	
1972 (26th)	Eileen Atkins	Vivat! Vivat Regina!	Elizabeth I	
1972 (26th)	Colleen Dewhurst	All Over	The Mistress	
1972 (26th)	Rosemary Harris	Old Times	Anna	
1973 (27th)
1973 (27th)	Julie Harris	The Last of Mrs. Lincoln	Mary Todd Lincoln	
1973 (27th)	Jane Alexander	6 Rms Riv Vu	Annie Miller	
1973 (27th)	Colleen Dewhurst	Mourning Becomes Electra	Christine Mannon	
1973 (27th)	Kathleen Widdoes	Much Ado About Nothing	Beatrice	
1974 (28th)
1974 (28th)	Colleen Dewhurst	A Moon for the Misbegotten	Josie Hogan	
1974 (28th)	Jane Alexander	Find Your Way Home	Jacqueline Harrison	
1974 (28th)	Julie Harris	The Au Pair Man	Elizabeth Rogers	
1974 (28th)	Madeline Kahn	In the Boom Boom Room	Chrissy	
1974 (28th)	Rachel Roberts	The Visit / Chemin de Fer	Claire Zachanassian / Francine	
1975 (29th)	Rachel Roberts			
1975 (29th)	Ellen Burstyn	Same Time, Next Year	Doris	
1975 (29th)	Elizabeth Ashley	Cat on a Hot Tin Roof	Maggie Pollitt	
1975 (29th)	Diana Rigg	The Misanthrope	Célimène	
1975 (29th)	Maggie Smith	Private Lives	Amanda Prynne	
1975 (29th)	Liv Ullmann	A Doll's House	Nora Helmer	
1976 (30th)
1976 (30th)	Irene Worth	Sweet Bird of Youth	Alexandra Del Lago	
1976 (30th)	Tovah Feldshuh	Yentl	Yentl	
1976 (30th)	Rosemary Harris	The Royal Family	Julie Cavendish	
1976 (30th)	Lynn Redgrave	Mrs. Warren's Profession	Vivie Warren	
1977 (31st)
1977 (31st)	Julie Harris	The Belle of Amherst	Emily Dickinson	
1977 (31st)	Colleen Dewhurst	Who's Afraid of Virginia Woolf?	Martha	
1977 (31st)	Liv Ullmann	Anna Christie	Anna Christopherson	
1977 (31st)	Irene Worth	The Cherry Orchard	Ranevskaya	
1978 (32nd)
1978 (32nd)	Jessica Tandy	The Gin Game	Fonsia Dorsey	
1978 (32nd)	Anne Bancroft	Golda	Golda Meir	
1978 (32nd)	Anita Gillette	Chapter Two	Jennie Malone	
1978 (32nd)	Estelle Parsons	Miss Margarida's Way	Miss Margarida	
1979 (33rd)
1979 (33rd)	Constance Cummings (TIE)	Wings	Emily Stilson	
1979 (33rd)	Carole Shelley (TIE)	The Elephant Man	Madge Kendal	
1979 (33rd)	Jane Alexander	First Monday in October	Ruth Loomis	
1979 (33rd)	Frances Sternhagen	On Golden Pond	Ethel Thayer	

=== 1980s ===
Year	Actress	Play	Role(s)	Ref.
1980 (34th)
1980 (34th)	Phyllis Frelich	Children of a Lesser God	Sarah Norman	
1980 (34th)	Blythe Danner	Betrayal	Emma	
1980 (34th)	Maggie Smith	Night and Day	Ruth Carson	
1980 (34th)	Anne Twomey	Nuts	Claudia Draper	
1981 (35th)
1981 (35th)	Jane Lapotaire	Piaf	Édith Piaf	
1981 (35th)	Glenda Jackson	Rose	Rose	
1981 (35th)	Eva Le Gallienne	To Grandmother's House We Go	Grandie	
1981 (35th)	Elizabeth Taylor	The Little Foxes	Regina Giddens	
1982 (36th)
1982 (36th)	Zoe Caldwell	Medea	Medea	
1982 (36th)	Katharine Hepburn	The West Side Waltz	Margaret Mary Elderdice	
1982 (36th)	Geraldine Page	Agnes of God	Mother Miriam Ruth	
1982 (36th)	Amanda Plummer	A Taste of Honey	Josephine	
1983 (37th)
1983 (37th)	Jessica Tandy	Foxfire	Annie Nations	
1983 (37th)	Kathy Bates	'night, Mother	Jessie Cates	
1983 (37th)	Kate Nelligan	Plenty	Susan Traherne	
1983 (37th)	Anne Pitoniak	'night, Mother	Thelma Cates	
1984 (38th)
1984 (38th)	Glenn Close	The Real Thing	Annie	
1984 (38th)	Rosemary Harris	Heartbreak House	Hesione Hushabye	
1984 (38th)	Linda Hunt	End of the World	Audrey Wood	
1984 (38th)	Kate Nelligan	A Moon for the Misbegotten	Josie Hogan	
1985 (39th)
1985 (39th)	Stockard Channing	A Day in the Death of Joe Egg	Sheila	
1985 (39th)	Sinéad Cusack	Much Ado About Nothing	Beatrice	
1985 (39th)	Rosemary Harris	Pack of Lies	Barbara Jackson	
1985 (39th)	Glenda Jackson	Strange Interlude	Nina Leeds	
1986 (40th)
1986 (40th)	Lily Tomlin	The Search for Signs of Intelligent Life in the Universe	Various Characters	
1986 (40th)	Rosemary Harris	Hay Fever	Judith Bliss	
1986 (40th)	Mary Beth Hurt	Benefactors	Sheila	
1986 (40th)	Jessica Tandy	The Petition	Elizabeth Milne	
1987 (41st)
1987 (41st)	Linda Lavin	Broadway Bound	Kate Jerome	
1987 (41st)	Lindsay Duncan	Dangerous Liaisons	Marquise de Merteuil	
1987 (41st)	Geraldine Page	Blithe Spirit	Madame Arcati	
1987 (41st)	Amanda Plummer	Pygmalion	Eliza Doolittle	
1988 (42nd)
1988 (42nd)	Joan Allen	Burn This	Anna Mann	
1988 (42nd)	Blythe Danner	A Streetcar Named Desire	Blanche DuBois	
1988 (42nd)	Glenda Jackson	Macbeth	Lady Macbeth	
1988 (42nd)	Frances McDormand	A Streetcar Named Desire	Stella Kowalski	
1989 (43rd)
1989 (43rd)	Pauline Collins	Shirley Valentine	Shirley Valentine	
1989 (43rd)	Joan Allen	The Heidi Chronicles	Heidi Holland	
1989 (43rd)	Madeline Kahn	Born Yesterday	Emma 'Billie' Dawn	
1989 (43rd)	Kate Nelligan	Spoils of War	Elise	

=== 1990s ===
Year	Actress	Play	Role(s)	Ref.
1990 (44th)
1990 (44th)	Maggie Smith	Lettice and Lovage	Lettice Douffet	
1990 (44th)	Geraldine James	The Merchant of Venice	Portia	
1990 (44th)	Mary-Louise Parker	Prelude to a Kiss	Rita Boyle	
1990 (44th)	Kathleen Turner	Cat on a Hot Tin Roof	Maggie Pollitt	
1991 (45th)
1991 (45th)	Mercedes Ruehl	Lost in Yonkers	Bella Kurnitz	
1991 (45th)	Stockard Channing	Six Degrees of Separation	Ouisa Kittredge	
1991 (45th)	Julie Harris	Lucifer's Child	Karen Blixen	
1991 (45th)	Cherry Jones	Our Country's Good	Liz Morden / Reverend Johnson	
1992 (46th)
1992 (46th)	Glenn Close	Death and the Maiden	Paulina Salas Escobar	
1992 (46th)	Jane Alexander	The Visit	Claire Zachanassian	
1992 (46th)	Stockard Channing	Four Baboons Adoring the Sun	Penny McKenzie	
1992 (46th)	Judith Ivey	Park Your Car in Harvard Yard	Kathleen Hogan	
1993 (47th)
1993 (47th)	Madeline Kahn	The Sisters Rosensweig	Gorgeous Teitelbaum	
1993 (47th)	Jane Alexander	The Sisters Rosensweig	Sara Goode	
1993 (47th)	Lynn Redgrave	Shakespeare for My Father	Lynn Redgrave	
1993 (47th)	Natasha Richardson	Anna Christie	Anna Christopherson	
1994 (48th)
1994 (48th)	Diana Rigg	Medea	Medea	
1994 (48th)	Anna Deavere Smith	Twilight: Los Angeles, 1992	Various Characters	
1994 (48th)	Nancy Marchand	Black Comedy	Sophie	
1994 (48th)	Nancy Marchand	The White Liars	Mrs. Furnival	
1994 (48th)	Joan Rivers	Sally Marr...and her escorts	Sally Marr	
1995 (49th)
1995 (49th)	Cherry Jones	The Heiress	Catherine Sloper	
1995 (49th)	Mary Alice	Having Our Say	Bessie Delany	
1995 (49th)	Eileen Atkins	Indiscretions	Léonie	
1995 (49th)	Helen Mirren	A Month in the Country	Natalia Petrovna	
1996 (50th)
1996 (50th)	Zoe Caldwell	Master Class	Maria Callas	
1996 (50th)	Carol Burnett	Moon Over Buffalo	Charlotte Hay	
1996 (50th)	Rosemary Harris	A Delicate Balance	Agnes	
1996 (50th)	Elaine Stritch	A Delicate Balance	Claire	
1997 (51st)
1997 (51st)	Janet McTeer	A Doll's House	Nora Helmer	
1997 (51st)	Julie Harris	The Gin Game	Fonsia Dorsey	
1997 (51st)	Shirley Knight	The Young Man From Atlanta	Lily Dale Kidder	
1997 (51st)	Lia Williams	Skylight	Kyra Hollis	
1998 (52nd)
1998 (52nd)	Marie Mullen	The Beauty Queen of Leenane	Maureen Folan	
1998 (52nd)	Jane Alexander	Honour	Honor	
1998 (52nd)	Allison Janney	A View from the Bridge	Beatrice Carbone	
1998 (52nd)	Geraldine McEwan	The Chairs	Old Woman	
1999 (53rd)
1999 (53rd)	Judi Dench	Amy's View	Esme Allen	
1999 (53rd)	Stockard Channing	The Lion in Winter	Eleanor of Aquitaine	
1999 (53rd)	Marian Seldes	Ring Round the Moon	Madame Desmermortes	
1999 (53rd)	Zoë Wanamaker	Electra	Electra	

=== 2000s ===
Year	Actress	Play	Role(s)	Ref.
2000 (54th)
2000 (54th)	Jennifer Ehle	The Real Thing	Annie	
2000 (54th)	Jayne Atkinson	The Rainmaker	Lizzie Curry	
2000 (54th)	Rosemary Harris	Waiting in the Wings	May Davenport	
2000 (54th)	Cherry Jones	A Moon for the Misbegotten	Josie Hogan	
2000 (54th)	Claudia Shear	Dirty Blonde	Jo / Mae West	
2001 (55th)
2001 (55th)	Mary-Louise Parker	Proof	Catherine Llewellyn	
2001 (55th)	Juliette Binoche	Betrayal	Emma	
2001 (55th)	Linda Lavin	The Tale of the Allergist's Wife	Marjorie Taub	
2001 (55th)	Jean Smart	The Man Who Came to Dinner	Lorraine Sheldon	
2001 (55th)	Leslie Uggams	King Hedley II	Ruby	
2002 (56th)
2002 (56th)	Lindsay Duncan	Private Lives	Amanda Prynne	
2002 (56th)	Kate Burton	Hedda Gabler	Hedda Gabler	
2002 (56th)	Laura Linney	The Crucible	Elizabeth Proctor	
2002 (56th)	Helen Mirren	The Dance of Death	Alice	
2002 (56th)	Mercedes Ruehl	The Goat, or Who Is Sylvia?	Stevie Gray	
2003 (57th)
2003 (57th)	Vanessa Redgrave	Long Day's Journey into Night	Mary Tyrone	
2003 (57th)	Jayne Atkinson	Enchanted April	Lotty Wilton	
2003 (57th)	Victoria Hamilton	A Day in the Death of Joe Egg	Sheila	
2003 (57th)	Clare Higgins	Vincent in Brixton	Ursula Loyler	
2003 (57th)	Fiona Shaw	Medea	Medea	
2004 (58th)
2004 (58th)	Phylicia Rashad	A Raisin in the Sun	Lena Younger	
2004 (58th)	Eileen Atkins	The Retreat from Moscow	Alice	
2004 (58th)	Tovah Feldshuh	Golda's Balcony	Golda Meir	
2004 (58th)	Anne Heche	Twentieth Century	Lily Garland / Mildred Plotka	
2004 (58th)	Swoosie Kurtz	Frozen	Nancy Shirley	
2005 (59th)
2005 (59th)	Cherry Jones	Doubt	Sister Aloysius Beauvier	
2005 (59th)	Laura Linney	Sight Unseen	Patricia	
2005 (59th)	Mary-Louise Parker	Reckless	Rachel	
2005 (59th)	Phylicia Rashad	Gem of the Ocean	Aunt Ester	
2005 (59th)	Kathleen Turner	Who's Afraid of Virginia Woolf?	Martha	
2006 (60th)
2006 (60th)	Cynthia Nixon	Rabbit Hole	Becca Corbett	
2006 (60th)	Kate Burton	The Constant Wife	Constance Culver Middleton	
2006 (60th)	Judy Kaye	Souvenir	Florence Foster Jenkins	
2006 (60th)	Lisa Kron	Well	Lisa Kron	
2006 (60th)	Lynn Redgrave	The Constant Wife	Mrs. Culver	
2007 (61st)
2007 (61st)	Julie White	The Little Dog Laughed	Diane	
2007 (61st)	Eve Best	A Moon for the Misbegotten	Josie Hogan	
2007 (61st)	Swoosie Kurtz	Heartbreak House	Hesione Hushabye	
2007 (61st)	Angela Lansbury	Deuce	Leona Mullen	
2007 (61st)	Vanessa Redgrave	The Year of Magical Thinking	Joan Didion	
2008 (62nd)
2008 (62nd)	Deanna Dunagan	August: Osage County	Violet Weston	
2008 (62nd)	Eve Best	The Homecoming	Ruth	
2008 (62nd)	Kate Fleetwood	Macbeth	Lady Macbeth	
2008 (62nd)	S. Epatha Merkerson	Come Back, Little Sheba	Lola Delaney	
2008 (62nd)	Amy Morton	August: Osage County	Barbara Weston-Fordham	
2009 (63rd)
2009 (63rd)	Marcia Gay Harden	God of Carnage	Veronica	
2009 (63rd)	Hope Davis	God of Carnage	Annette	
2009 (63rd)	Jane Fonda	33 Variations	Katherine Brandt	
2009 (63rd)	Janet McTeer	Mary Stuart	Mary Stuart	
2009 (63rd)	Harriet Walter	Mary Stuart	Elizabeth I	

=== 2010s ===
Year	Actress	Play	Role(s)	Ref.
2010 (64th)
2010 (64th)	Viola Davis	Fences	Rose Maxson	
2010 (64th)	Valerie Harper	Looped	Tallulah Bankhead	
2010 (64th)	Linda Lavin	Collected Stories	Ruth Steiner	
2010 (64th)	Laura Linney	Time Stands Still	Sarah Goodwin	
2010 (64th)	Jan Maxwell	The Royal Family	Julie Cavendish	
2011 (65th)
2011 (65th)	Frances McDormand	Good People	Margie Walsh	
2011 (65th)	Nina Arianda	Born Yesterday	Emma 'Billie' Dawn	
2011 (65th)	Lily Rabe	The Merchant of Venice	Portia	
2011 (65th)	Vanessa Redgrave	Driving Miss Daisy	Daisy Werthan	
2011 (65th)	Hannah Yelland	Brief Encounter	Laura Jesson	
2012 (66th)
2012 (66th)	Nina Arianda	Venus in Fur	Vanda	
2012 (66th)	Tracie Bennett	End of the Rainbow	Judy Garland	
2012 (66th)	Stockard Channing	Other Desert Cities	Polly Wyeth	
2012 (66th)	Linda Lavin	The Lyons	Rita Lyons	
2012 (66th)	Cynthia Nixon	Wit	Vivian Bearing	
2013 (67th)
2013 (67th)	Cicely Tyson	The Trip to Bountiful	Carrie Watts	
2013 (67th)	Laurie Metcalf	The Other Place	Juliana Smithton	
2013 (67th)	Amy Morton	Who's Afraid of Virginia Woolf?	Martha	
2013 (67th)	Kristine Nielsen	Vanya and Sonia and Masha and Spike	Sonia	
2013 (67th)	Holland Taylor	Ann	Ann Richards	
2014 (68th)
2014 (68th)	Audra McDonald	Lady Day at Emerson's Bar and Grill	Billie Holiday	
2014 (68th)	Tyne Daly	Mothers and Sons	Katharine Gerard	
2014 (68th)	Cherry Jones	The Glass Menagerie	Amanda Wingfield	
2014 (68th)	Estelle Parsons	The Velocity of Autumn	Alexandra	
2014 (68th)	LaTanya Richardson	A Raisin in the Sun	Lena Younger	
2015 (69th)
2015 (69th)	Helen Mirren	The Audience	Queen Elizabeth II	
2015 (69th)	Geneva Carr	Hand To God	Margery	
2015 (69th)	Elisabeth Moss	The Heidi Chronicles	Heidi Holland	
2015 (69th)	Carey Mulligan	Skylight	Kyra Hollis	
2015 (69th)	Ruth Wilson	Constellations	Marianne	
2016 (70th)
2016 (70th)	Jessica Lange	Long Day's Journey into Night	Mary Tyrone	
2016 (70th)	Laurie Metcalf	Misery	Annie Wilkes	
2016 (70th)	Lupita Nyong'o	Eclipsed	The Girl	
2016 (70th)	Sophie Okonedo	The Crucible	Elizabeth Proctor	
2016 (70th)	Michelle Williams	Blackbird	Una Spencer	
2017 (71st)
2017 (71st)	Laurie Metcalf	A Doll's House, Part 2	Nora Helmer	
2017 (71st)	Cate Blanchett	The Present	Anna Petrovna	
2017 (71st)	Jennifer Ehle	Oslo	Mona Juul	
2017 (71st)	Sally Field	The Glass Menagerie	Amanda Wingfield	
2017 (71st)	Laura Linney	The Little Foxes	Regina Hubbard Giddens	
2018 (72nd)
2018 (72nd)	Glenda Jackson	Three Tall Women	A	
2018 (72nd)	Condola Rashad	Saint Joan	Joan of Arc	
2018 (72nd)	Lauren Ridloff	Children of a Lesser God	Sarah Norman	
2018 (72nd)	Amy Schumer	Meteor Shower	Corky	
2019 (73rd)
2019 (73rd)	Elaine May	The Waverly Gallery	Gladys Green	
2019 (73rd)	Annette Bening	All My Sons	Kate Keller	
2019 (73rd)	Laura Donnelly	The Ferryman	Caitlin Carney	
2019 (73rd)	Janet McTeer	Bernhardt/Hamlet	Sarah Bernhardt	
2019 (73rd)	Laurie Metcalf	Hillary and Clinton	Hillary Clinton	
2019 (73rd)	Heidi Schreck	What the Constitution Means to Me	Heidi Schreck	

=== 2020s ===
Year	Actress	Play	Role(s)
2020 (74th)
2020 (74th)	Mary-Louise Parker	The Sound Inside	Bella Baird
2020 (74th)	Joaquina Kalukango	Slave Play	Kaneisha
2020 (74th)	Laura Linney	My Name Is Lucy Barton	Lucy Barton
2020 (74th)	Audra McDonald	Frankie and Johnny in the Clair de Lune	Frankie
2022 (75th)
2022 (75th)	Deirdre O'Connell	Dana H.	Dana H.
2022 (75th)	Gabby Beans	The Skin of Our Teeth	Sabina
2022 (75th)	LaChanze	Trouble in Mind	Wiletta Mayer
2022 (75th)	Ruth Negga	Macbeth	Lady Macbeth
2022 (75th)	Mary-Louise Parker	How I Learned to Drive	Li'l Bit
2023 (76th)
2023 (76th)	Jodie Comer	Prima Facie	Tessa Ensler
2023 (76th)	Jessica Chastain	A Doll's House	Nora Helmer
2023 (76th)	Jessica Hecht	Summer, 1976	Alice
2023 (76th)	Audra McDonald	Ohio State Murders	Suzanne Alexander
2024 (77th)
2024 (77th)	Sarah Paulson	Appropriate	Antoinette "Toni" Lafayette
2024 (77th)	Betsy Aidem	Prayer for the French Republic	Marcelle Salomon Benhamou
2024 (77th)	Jessica Lange	Mother Play	Phyllis
2024 (77th)	Rachel McAdams	Mary Jane	Mary Jane
2024 (77th)	Amy Ryan	Doubt: A Parable	Sister Aloysius Beauvier
2025 (78th)
2025 (78th)	Sarah Snook	The Picture of Dorian Gray	Dorian Gray, et al.
2025 (78th)	Laura Donnelly	The Hills of California	Veronica / Joan
2025 (78th)	Mia Farrow	The Roommate	Sharon
2025 (78th)	LaTanya Richardson Jackson	Purpose	Claudine Jasper
2025 (78th)	Sadie Sink	John Proctor Is the Villain	Shelby Holcomb
2026 (79th)
2026 (79th)	Lesley Manville	Oedipus	Jocasta
2026 (79th)	Rose Byrne	Fallen Angels	Jane Banbury
2026 (79th)	Carrie Coon	Bug	Agnes White
2026 (79th)	Susannah Flood	Liberation	Lizzie
2026 (79th)	Kelli O'Hara	Fallen Angels	Julia Sterroll

== Most wins ==
5 wins

- Julie Harris

3 wins

- Zoe Caldwell
- Jessica Tandy

2 wins

- Shirley Booth
- Glenn Close
- Uta Hagen
- Helen Hayes
- Cherry Jones
- Margaret Leighton
- Mary-Louise Parker
- Irene Worth

=== Most nominations ===
9 nominations

- Julie Harris

8 nominations

- Rosemary Harris

7 nominations

- Colleen Dewhurst

6 Nominations

- Jane Alexander

5 nominations

- Stockard Channing
- Cherry Jones
- Laura Linney
- Mary-Louise Parker

4 nominations

- Eileen Atkins
- Glenda Jackson
- Linda Lavin
- Margaret Leighton
- Laurie Metcalf
- Estelle Parsons
- Maureen Stapleton
- Jessica Tandy
- Irene Worth

3 nominations

- Zoe Caldwell
- Helen Hayes
- Madeline Kahn
- Audra McDonald
- Janet McTeer
- Helen Mirren
- Kate Nelligan
- Geraldine Page
- Lynn Redgrave
- Vanessa Redgrave
- Diana Rigg
- Maggie Smith

2 nominations

- Joan Allen
- Nina Arianda
- Elizabeth Ashley
- Jayne Atkinson
- Anne Bancroft
- Barbara Bel Geddes
- Eve Best
- Shirley Booth
- Kate Burton
- Glenn Close
- Gladys Cooper
- Blythe Danner
- Laura Donnelly
- Lindsay Duncan
- Jennifer Ehle
- Tovah Feldshuh
- Uta Hagen
- LaTanya Richardson Jackson
- Swoosie Kurtz
- Jessica Lange
- Frances McDormand
- Siobhán McKenna
- Claudia McNeil
- Amy Morton
- Cynthia Nixon
- Amanda Plummer
- Phylicia Rashad
- Mercedes Ruehl
- Marian Seldes
- Kim Stanley
- Kathleen Turner
- Liv Ullmann

== Character win total ==
3 wins

- Medea from Medea

2 wins

- Amanda Prynne from Private Lives
- Annie from The Real Thing
- Joan of Arc from Joan of Lorraine and The Lark
- Mary Tyrone from Long Day's Journey into Night
- Nora Helmer from A Doll's House and A Doll's House, Part 2

== Character nomination total ==
5 nominations

- Josie Hogan from A Moon for the Misbegotten

4 nominations

- Medea from Medea
- Martha from Who's Afraid of Virginia Woolf?
- Nora Helmer from A Doll's House and A Doll's House, Part 2

3 nominations

- Amanda Prynne from Private Lives
- Beatrice from Much Ado About Nothing
- Claire Zachanassian from The Visit
- Joan of Arc from Joan of Lorraine, The Lark and Saint Joan
- Lady Macbeth from Macbeth
- Lena Younger from A Raisin in the Sun
- Maggie Pollitt from Cat on a Hot Tin Roof
- Mary Tyrone from Long Day's Journey into Night

2 nominations

- Amanda Wingfield from The Glass Menagerie
- Anna Christopherson from Anna Christie
- Annie from The Real Thing
- Blanche DuBois from A Streetcar Named Desire
- Claire from A Delicate Balance
- Eleanor of Aquitaine from The Lion in Winter
- Elizabeth I from Vivat! Vivat Regina! and Mary Stuart
- Elizabeth Proctor from The Crucible
- Emma from Betrayal
- Emma 'Billie' Dawn from Born Yesterday
- Fonsia Dorsey from The Gin Game
- Golda Meir from Golda and Golda's Balcony
- Heidi Holland from The Heidi Chronicles
- Hesione Hushabye from Heartbreak House
- Josephine from A Taste of Honey
- Julie Cavendish from The Royal Family
- Kyra Hollis from Skylight
- Lola Delaney from Come Back, Little Sheba
- Portia from The Merchant of Venice
- Princess Cosmonopolis from Sweet Bird of Youth
- Regina Giddens from The Little Foxes
- Ruth from The Homecoming
- Sarah Melody from A Touch of the Poet and More Stately Mansions
- Sarah Norman from Children of a Lesser God
- Sheila from A Day in the Death of Joe Egg
- Sister Aloysius Beauvier from Doubt

Characters nominated for both the Tony Award for Best Actress in a Musical and Tony Award for Best Actress in a Play

- Joan of Arc from Goodtime Charley, Saint Joan, Joan of Lorraine and The Lark
- Countess Aurelia from The Madwoman of Chaillot and Dear World
- Sally Bowles from I Am a Camera and Cabaret
- Leona Samish from The Time of the Cuckoo and Do I Hear a Waltz?
- Dolly Gallagher Levi from The Matchmaker and Hello Dolly!
- Lena Younger from A Raisin in the Sun and Raisin
- Mame Dennis from Auntie Mame and Mame
- Eliza Gant from Look Homeward, Angel and Angel
- Claire Zachanassian The Visit (play) and The Visit (musical)
- Sister Margaret Alexander from The Amen Corner and Amen Corner (musical)
- Eliza Doolittle from Pygmalion and My Fair Lady
- Lizzie Curry from The Rainmaker and 110 in the Shade.
- Lily Garland / Mildred Plotka from Twentieth Century and On the Twentieth Century
- Madame Arcati from Blithe Spirit and High Spirits
- Anna Christopherson from Anna Christie and New Girl in Town

== Productions with multiple nominations ==
boldface=Winner

- The Chalk Garden – Gladys Cooper and Siobhán McKenna
- Toys in the Attic – Maureen Stapleton and Irene Worth
- The Killing of Sister George – **Beryl Reid** and Eileen Atkins
- 'night, Mother – Kathy Bates and Anne Pitoniak
- A Streetcar Named Desire – Blythe Danner and Frances McDormand
- The Sisters Rosensweig – **Madeline Kahn** and Jane Alexander
- A Delicate Balance – Rosemary Harris and Elaine Stritch
- August: Osage County – **Deanna Dunagan** and Amy Morton
- God of Carnage – **Marcia Gay Harden** and Hope Davis (produced during the same season as Mary Stuart)
- Mary Stuart – Janet McTeer and Harriet Walter (produced during the same season as God of Carnage)
- Fallen Angels – Rose Byrne and Kelli O'Hara

== Multiple awards and nominations ==
Actresses who have been nominated multiple times in any acting categories

Awards	Nominations	Recipient
6	11	Audra McDonald
5	10	Julie Harris
5	7	Angela Lansbury
4	6	Gwen Verdon
4	4	Zoe Caldwell
3	8	Patti LuPone
3	7	Laurie Metcalf
3	5	Irene Worth
3	5	Jessica Tandy
3	4	Glenn Close
3	4	Mary Martin
3	3	Shirley Booth
2	10	Chita Rivera
2	8	Colleen Dewhurst
2	7	Bernadette Peters
2	7	Frances Sternhagen
2	7	Sutton Foster
2	6	Andrea Martin
2	6	Maureen Stapleton
2	5	Victoria Clark
2	5	Cherry Jones
2	5	Donna Murphy
2	5	Mary-Louise Parker
2	5	Swoosie Kurtz
2	4	Christine Ebersole
2	4	Cynthia Nixon
2	4	Judith Ivey
2	4	Judy Kaye
2	4	Kara Young
2	4	Margaret Leighton
2	3	Anne Bancroft
2	3	Bebe Neuwirth
2	3	Helen Gallagher
2	3	Helen Hayes
2	3	Jennifer Ehle
2	3	Judith Light
2	3	Liza Minnelli
2	3	Phylicia Rashad
2	3	Viola Davis
2	2	Christine Baranski
2	2	Katie Finneran
2	2	Lauren Bacall
2	2	Sandy Dennis
2	2	Tammy Grimes
2	2	Uta Hagen
1
1	9	Kelli O'Hara
1	9	Rosemary Harris
1	8	Jane Alexander
1	7	Stockard Channing
1	6	Linda Lavin
1	5	Celia Keenan-Bolger
1	5	Glenda Jackson
1	5	Jayne Houdyshell
1	5	Laura Benanti
1	5	Marian Seldes
1	4	Blythe Danner
1	4	Carol Channing
1	4	Carole Shelley
1	4	Debra Monk
1	4	Diana Rigg
1	4	Faith Prince
1	4	Jessie Mueller
1	4	Julie White
1	4	Karen Ziemba
1	4	LaChanze
1	4	Madeline Kahn
1	3	Amanda Plummer
1	3	Annaleigh Ashford
1	3	Barbara Harris
1	3	Beth Leavel
1	3	Dorothy Loudon
1	3	Elizabeth Ashley
1	3	Elizabeth Franz
1	3	Ethel Merman
1	3	Helen Mirren
1	3	Idina Menzel
1	3	Jane Krakowski
1	3	Janet McTeer
1	3	Joanna Gleason
1	3	Kristin Chenoweth
1	3	Lois Smith
1	3	Maggie Smith
1	3	Mercedes Ruehl
1	3	Rae Allen
1	3	Shoshana Bean
1	3	Stephanie J. Block
1	3	Tonya Pinkins
1	3	Tyne Daly
1	3	Vanessa Redgrave
1	2	Adriane Lenox
1	2	Adrienne Warren
1	2	Alexis Smith
1	2	Alice Ghostly
1	2	Alice Ripley
1	2	Anika Noni Rose
1	2	Anna Manahan
1	2	Barbara Cook
1	2	Betty Buckley
1	2	Cady Huffman
1	2	Dolores Gray
1	2	Frances McDormand
1	2	Gretha Boston
1	2	Jessica Lange
1	2	Jo Van Fleet
1	2	Joan Allen
1	2	Joaquina Kalukango
1	2	Judith Anderson
1	2	Karen Olivo
1	2	Leora Dana
1	2	Leslie Uggams
1	2	Liliane Montevecchi
1	2	Lillias White
1	2	Linda Hopkins
1	2	Lindsay Duncan
1	2	Lindsay Mendez
1	2	Lotte Lenya
1	2	Lynne Thigpen
1	2	Marcia Gay Harden
1	2	Margaret Tyzack
1	2	Maria Karnilova
1	2	Mary Alice
1	2	Maryann Plunkett
1	2	Mary Louise Wilson
1	2	Nanette Fabray
1	2	Natasha Richardson
1	2	Nikki M. James
1	2	Nina Arianda
1	2	Patina Miller
1	2	Patricia Elliott
1	2	Patsy Kelly
1	2	Phyllis Newman
1	2	Priscilla Lopez
1	2	Randy Graff
1	2	Rosalind Russell
1	2	Ruthie Ann Miles
1	2	Shirley Knight
1	2	Sophie Okonedo

Nominations	Recipient
5	Dana Ivey
5	Laura Linney
5	Estelle Parsons
5	Jan Maxwell
4	Condola Rashad
4	Eileen Atkins
4	Elaine Stritch
4	Geraldine Page
4	Judy Kuhn
4	Kate Nelligan
4	Tovah Feldshuh
4	Zoë Wanamaker
3	Amy Ryan
3	Brenda Vaccaro
3	Carolee Carmello
3	Dee Hoty
3	Eileen Heckart
3	Jennifer Simard
3	Jessica Hecht
3	Julie Andrews
3	Kate Burton
3	Linda Emond
3	Louise Troy
3	Lynn Redgrave
3	Marin Mazzie
3	Martha Plimpton
3	Mary Beth Hurt
3	Mary Testa
3	Rebecca Luker
3	Rosemary Murphy
3	Sandy Duncan
2	Alison Fraser
2	Allison Janney
2	Amy Morton
2	Ann Reinking
2	Anne Pitoniak
2	Annette Bening
2	Barbara Bel Geddes
2	Barbra Streisand
2	Beatrice Lillie
2	Beth Fowler
2	Betsy Aidem
2	Carmen Cusack
2	Carol Burnett
2	Carrie Coon
2	Charlotte d'Amboise
2	Charlotte Rae
2	Christine Andreas
2	Claudia McNeil
2	Crista Moore
2	Daphne Rubin-Vega
2	Debbie Allen
2	Diana Sands
2	Eartha Kitt
2	Elizabeth Allen
2	Ernestine Jackson
2	Eva Noblezada
2	Eve Best
2	Fionnula Flanagan
2	Georgia Brown
2	Gladys Cooper
2	Inga Swenson
2	Jane Fonda
2	Jayne Atkinson
2	Johanna Day
2	Josephine Premice
2	Josie de Guzman
2	Julienne Marie
2	Kate Baldwin
2	Kate Reid
2	Katharine Hepburn
2	Kathleen Turner
2	Kim Stanley
2	Kristine Nielsen
2	LaTanya Richardson Jackson
2	Laura Donnelly
2	Laura Osnes
2	Leland Palmer
2	Liv Ullmann
2	Marcia Lewis
2	Mare Winningham
2	Mary Beth Peil
2	Megan Hilty
2	Michele Lee
2	Mildred Natwick
2	Millicent Martin
2	Nancy Dussault
2	Nancy Walker
2	Penny Fuller
2	Pert Kelton
2	Rachel Dratch
2	Ruth Wilson
2	S. Epatha Merkerson
2	Sarah Stiles
2	Sherie Rene Scott
2	Sinéad Cusack
2	Siobhán McKenna
2	Spencer Kayden
2	Susan Browning
2	Tammy Blanchard
2	Vivian Reed
2	Zohra Lampert

== See also ==
- Best Actress
- Dorian Award for Outstanding Lead Performance in a Broadway Play
- Drama Desk Award for Outstanding Actress in a Play
- Drama Desk Award for Outstanding Lead Performance in a Play
- Drama League Award for Distinguished Performance
- Laurence Olivier Award for Best Actress
- Lists of acting awards
- Outer Critics Circle Award for Outstanding Lead Performer in a Broadway Play
