= Jason Hale (actor) =

American actor (born 1971)

- Born: July 3, 1971 (age 55); Allentown, Pennsylvania, U.S.
- Occupations: Professor, director and actor
- Years active: 1989–present

Jason Hale (born July 3, 1971) is an American actor, international theatre director, professor and chair of theatre at Bilkent University in Ankara, Turkey.

Hale spent over a decade working as a professional actor, performing at many New York and regional ensemble theaters and acting in several independent and feature films, but he is better known as a theatre director and teacher of Method acting and Viola Spolin improvisation, guided by a nearly two-decade association with John Uecker, George Morrison, Mike Nichols, and Paul Sills.

In addition to directing plays in the United States, he directed three plays for the National Turkish State Theatre including the award-winning 2011 production of Tennessee Williams's The Glass Menagerie (Sirca Kumes) In 2023 he directed Tennessee Williams’ Suddenly Last Summer at the Sokhumi State Drama Theatre in Tbilisi, Georgia which also played at the Istanbul International Theatre Festival. He also directed in Turkey the 2016 production of Sam Shepard's Fool for Love (Aşk Aptalı) in Ankara, Turkey at Tatbikat Sahnesi starring Burcu Özberk, the 2017 First Prize Best University production (Istanbul University Festival) of Clifford Odett's Waiting For Lefty at Bilkent University, and John Steinbeck's Of Mice and Men for Turkish National State Theatre in Adana, Turkey 2017-2020.

== Education ==
Jason Hale is a 1993 graduate of the New Actors Workshop in New York City, where he studied acting with George Morrison, Mike Nichols, and Paul Sills. After graduating, Hale continued to work and study privately with Mr. Sills to learn more about he and his mother's, Viola Spolin, improvisational work. While a student at New Actors Workshop, Hale became an intern and then a member of The Blue Circle Theater Company in Door County Wisconsin. The company was led by Diane Paulus, under the artistic guidance of Paul Sills and Beatrice Lees, sister of Viola Spolin.

In 1998, under the auspice of Mr. Sills, Hale became a member of the Spolin-based improvisational company, The Resident Company. The troupe, led by Gerrit Graham, featured early Sills players, Garry Goodrow, Cordis Heard, and Penny White. The company performed at the Albert Grossman Bearsville Studios in upstate New York. Hale then founded and directed the Off Off Broadway[Theatre Project Ensemble in New York City from 1999 until 2004 when Mr. Sills served as the ensemble's artistic advisor. The group dedicated itself to passing along the improvisational work of Sills and Spolin through improvisational workshops and Story Theater model performances.

== Teaching ==
In 2006, Sills recommended and endorsed Jason as "uniquely equipped to impart the improvisational work of Viola Spolin" as a teacher and director. He became a Fulbright Specialist Roster Candidate to teach Viola Spolin Improvisation in 2012. He has taught Viola Spolin improvisation and sense memory for seven years as a senior faculty member at the New Actors Workshop He has taught acting at numerous universities and schools including at the Stella Adler Studio of Acting at New York University, the Tisch School of the Arts, HB Studios, School of Visual Arts, Film and Video-Continuing Education, New York Film Academy, and Antioch University-McGregor, and through private workshops and guest residencies.

Internationally, he has taught several workshops at universities and festivals in Turkey, China, Ukraine, Mexico and Poland. In 2010 he introduced the work of Viola Spolin at ACTUANDO SIN ACTUAR, the first annual international acting method festival in Aguascalientes, Mexico. Jason is currently Assistant Professor and Chair of the Theatre Department at the Faculty of Music and Performing Arts at Bilkent University in Ankara, Turkey.

=== Bilkent University ===
In 2013, Hale accepted the position to teach acting and direct as a Visiting Assistant Professor at Bilkent University-Faculty of Music and Performing Arts in Ankara, Turkey. Within the academic year, Hale was offered to chair and head the department of theatre. Since 2014, as Chair of the Department of Theatre, Hale has initiated and implemented international collaboration agreements with The Shanghai Theatre Academy in China and The Aleksander Zelwerowicz National Academy of Dramatic Art in Warsaw Hale has invited many well known teachers and directors from around the world to lead seminars and direct student productions. In 2016, Broadwayworld.com ranked Bilkent Theatre Department among the top five performing arts departments in Turkey. In 2015, Hale turned a national university theatre festival into an international university theatre festival called Bilkent Theatre Days. Universities from China, Israel, Macedonia, Iran, USA, and Colombia have participated since. Hale also founded and oversees a Theatre for Kids program which teaches nearly two hundred students ages 8–10 and 11-13 each year on the weekends at Bilkent University.

== Other ==
Hale studied refinements of method acting with John Uecker. In 1995, he became a member of Mr. Uecker's Running Sun Theater Company and befriended the company's lead writer, James Purdy. He became a longtime friend and one of Mr. Purdy's frequent assistants.
