= Betty Lou Holland =

American actress (1926–2021)

- Born: December 26, 1925; New York City, U.S.
- Died: January 10, 2021 (aged 95); New York City, U.S.
- Occupation: Actress
- Years active: 1954–1960
- Spouse: Robert Cordier (m. 1962; died 2020)
- Children: 2

Betty Lou Holland (December 26, 1925 – January 10, 2021), also known as Betty Lou Cordier, was an American actress who worked on stage, in television, and in film during the decades of the 1940s, 1950s, and early 1960s. She was best known for her work on Broadway and as a lead in a 1960 television adaptation of The Devil and Daniel Webster.

== Biography ==
Betty Lou Holland was born in New York City on December 26, 1925. She began acting on the stage in the 1940s and appeared on Broadway, in Call Me Mister, Annie Get Your Gun, and The Devil's Disciple.

In The Member of the Wedding, the actress was in her 20s when she played a 12 year old.

She continued to act on stage through the 1950s, playing a leading role in Six Characters in Search of an Author, and the George Bernard Shaw play, The Devil's Disciple.

Holland acted in television programs in the 1950s. Holland was one of the principal roles of the NBC television adaptation of The Devil and Daniel Webster.

Holland played in the NBC-television special, Johnny Belinda in 1958. She also appeared in a TV version of Daphne Du Maurier's The Birds on the CBS series Danger on May 31, 1955. In 1958 she portrayed a secretary recovering from mental illness in the TV drama series Decoy.

She was in only two motion pictures, playing the role of Mrs. Faulkner, mother of Kim Stanley's character, in The Goddess (1958) and playing Roz Moreland in The Man in the Net (1959).

In The Goddess, Holland recalled that the religious conversion scene, which was long, was applauded by the Hollywood crew, not for the acting, but because all actors had remembered their lines.

== Personal life ==
She married Robert Cordier, a Belgian-Franco-American director and poet, in January 1962 in New York. They had two children, Cecilia Cordier and Horace Cordier. Robert Cordier died in Paris in April 2020, from complications of COVID-19. Betty Lou Cordier survived a COVID-19 infection, but died some months later in New York City on January 10, 2021, at the age of 95.
