= Alfred Ryder =

American actor (1916–1995)

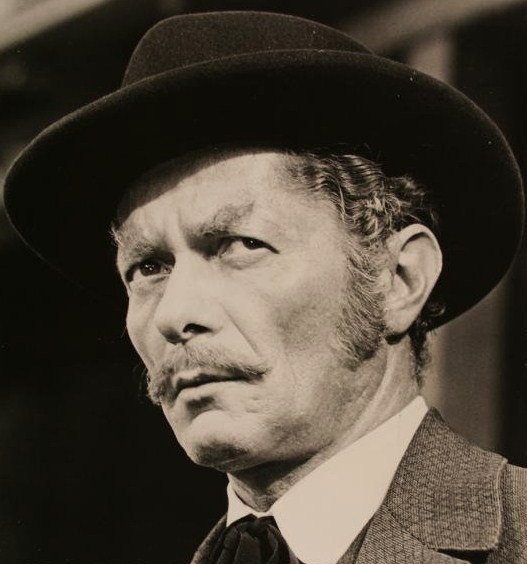
- Ryder in Invitation to a Gunfighter (1964)
- Born: Alfred Jacob Corn; January 5, 1916; New York City, U.S.
- Died: April 16, 1995 (aged 79); Englewood, New Jersey, U.S.
- Occupation: Actor
- Years active: 1944–1980
- Spouse: Kim Stanley (m. 1958; div. 1964)
- Children: 1
- Relatives: Olive Deering (sister)

Alfred Ryder (born Alfred Jacob Corn; January 5, 1916 – April 16, 1995) was an American television, stage, radio, and film actor and director, who appeared in over 100 television shows.

== Career ==
Ryder began to act at age 8 and later studied with Robert Lewis and Lee Strasberg. He eventually became a life member of The Actors Studio.

During the 1930s/40s, Ryder blended Broadway appearances with two memorable roles during the Golden Age of Radio: as Molly Goldberg's son Sammy in The Goldbergs; and as Carl Neff in Easy Aces. During World War II, he served in the United States Army Air Forces and appeared in the Air Force's Broadway play and film Winged Victory (1943). Earlier he starred as Dr. Young in the Broadway cast of Medicine Show (1940). In 1946, he secured a one-year film contract with Paramount and had a large role as an undercover cop in the Anthony Mann-directed T-Men (1947).

Ryder was an ambitious and intense theater performer who aspired to be "the definitive Hamlet of his generation." In the 1940s, he joined the American Repertory Theatre, founded by Margaret Webster and Eva Le Gallienne; Webster's follow-up troupe, the Margaret Webster Shakespeare Company—for which he toured as Hamlet; and ultimately The Actors Studio. In the 1950s, he appeared on Broadway (supplemented with television work), his most fruitful years coinciding with his 1958-1964 marriage to Kim Stanley, whom he directed in the 1961 Broadway hit A Far Country.

In 1956, Atlantic Records released the spoken-word album This Is My Beloved with Ryder's reciting the popular poetry of Walter Benton.

Notably, Ryder was chosen to be Laurence Olivier's standby when The Entertainer moved to Broadway from London in 1958.

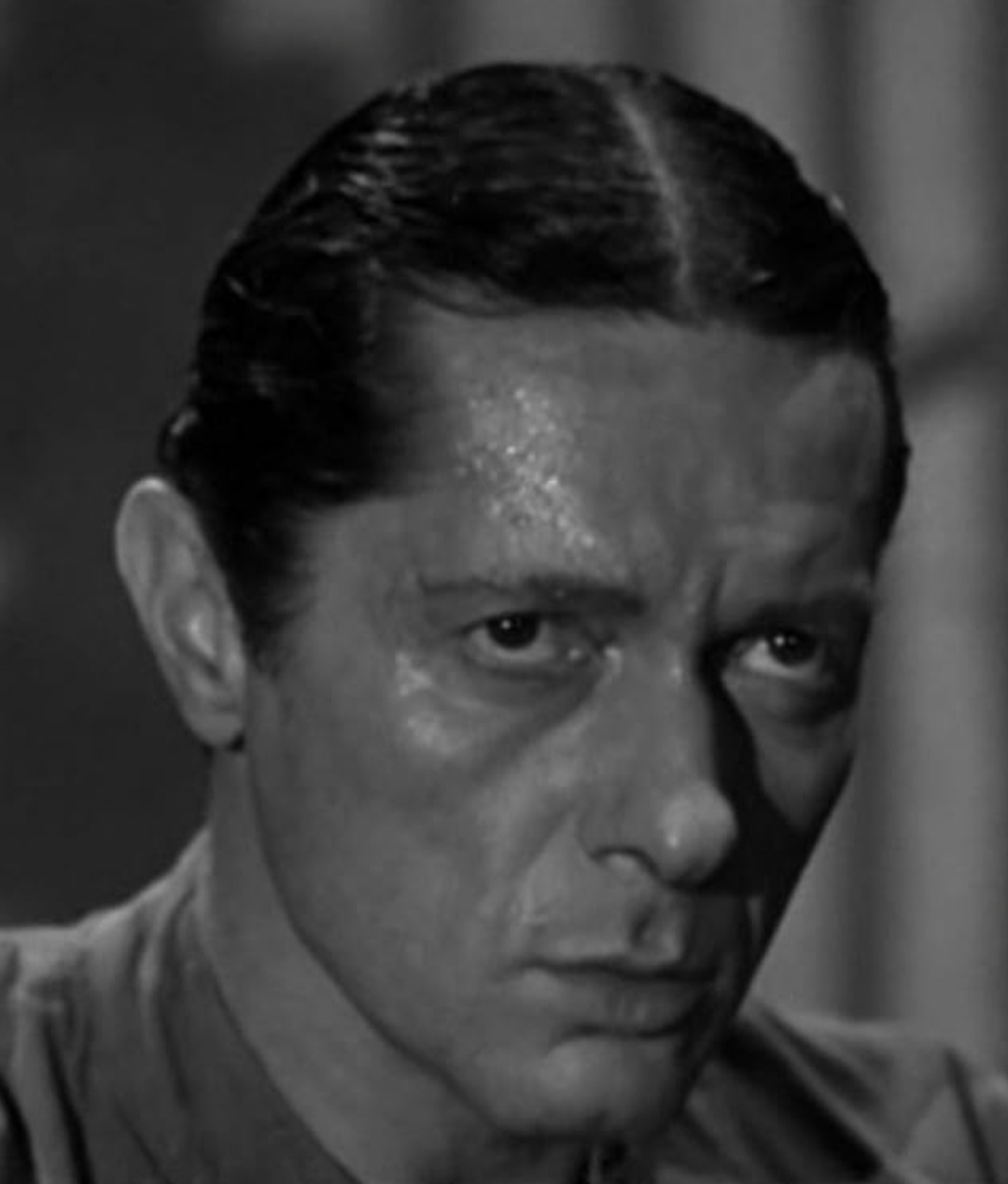
Ryder in an episode of One Step Beyond (1959)

He won the 1959 Obie Award for Best Actor, playing D.H. Lawrence in Tennessee Williams' one-act play I Rise in Flame, Cried the Phoenix. Kim Stanley hosted the awards presentation, but her husband was away in rehearsals for a CBS adaptation of Billy Budd, having been cast as Claggart as a rush replacement for an ailing Jason Robards, Jr. Ryder's growing association with the less-vaunted medium was reflected in TIME's announcement of their marriage; Stanley was feted as "star of Broadway's Bus Stop, and of Hollywood's The Goddess, whose training at the Actors' Studio [sic] made her the standard Brando of U.S. actresses," and Ryder was solely identified as "TV actor Alfred Ryder," with no mention of Ryder's association with The Actors Studio.

In 1961, Ryder was cast as Eli Wallach's first replacement as Bérenger (a role originated in London by Olivier) in the Broadway production of Eugène Ionesco's Rhinoceros. Ryder also toured in the part with Zero Mostel, who had won a Tony Award in the play's other starring role.

In 1964, 48-year-old Ryder was selected by Joseph Papp to realize his dream of performing Hamlet in a high-profile production: a three-week engagement for Papp's Shakespeare in the Park. Notoriously, he was replaced on June 17, the day after opening night, by Robert Burr, who was understudying Richard Burton in the same role on Broadway. According to press reports, Ryder was suffering from laryngitis by the premiere, which was broadcast on CBS, but co-star Stacy Keach also recounted Ryder’s erratic performances and difficulty remembering lines in rehearsals due to drinking. Actress Lee Grant stated that Ryder’s stage career was “ruined” by the fact that the performance was televised and that Ryder was replaced afterward, compounded by Papp’s public refusal to allow Ryder to return to the role following his recovery from the throat infection.

The disappointment to Ryder was "acute," according to Ellen Adler, daughter of famed acting coach Stella Adler. "He was sort of promised he would be a great Broadway star, and somehow it never happened." Ryder never again acted on or off-Broadway, but he subsequently directed two Broadway plays: 1968's The Exercise and a 1971 production of The Dance of Death—both of which closed in less than one week. (In Los Angeles, Ryder directed for UCLA's Theatre Group as a member of the Actors Studio Directors Unit; for the U.S. government's Educational Laboratory Theatre Project; and for the Los Angeles Free Shakespeare Festival as its artistic director.)

Nevertheless, Ryder remained an A-list television guest star throughout the 1960s as his eccentric, theatrical style and vaguely Germanic accent were well-suited for the sci-fi, spy, and fantasy shows that were popular at the time. He appeared in multiple episodes of The Wild Wild West and The Man from U.N.C.L.E., and he played the alien leader Mr. Nexus in the TV series The Invaders (two seasons, 1967-1968). He starred as a British criminal who could not be killed in Alcoa Presents: One Step Beyond episode "The Devil's Laughter" (1959). He appeared in "The Man Trap", the first-aired episode of Star Trek on September 8, 1966 as a scientist who is hiding the fact that a shapeshifting alien is masquerading as his late wife. He also guest-starred as the ghost of a World War I U-boat captain in two episodes of Irwin Allen's TV series Voyage to the Bottom of the Sea. He then acted in an episode of another Irwin Allen series on ABC as a cantankerous orphanage operator in "Night of Thrombeldinbar", an episode of Land of the Giants in February 1969. Later he appeared in the episode "A Hand for Sonny Blue" in the series Quinn Martin's Tales of the Unexpected (1977, known in the United Kingdom as Twist in the Tale).

Ryder's film work was more sporadic; his highest-profile role was the defense attorney who cross-examines John Wayne in True Grit (1969).

By the 1970s, Ryder's credits had diminished, and his last significant role came in 1979, on Steve Allen's show Meeting of Minds, for which he also co-directed two episodes. Despite an energetic performance as Machiavelli with extensive dialogue, Ryder only appeared once more onscreen as restaurateur Mike Romanoff in the 1980 biopic Bogie.

In his later years Ryder lived with his sister, actress Olive Deering, eventually moving to the Actors Home in New Jersey, where he died of liver cancer in 1995.

== Personal life ==
Born to Jewish parents, he was married to actress Kim Stanley from 1958 until 1964. The couple had a child, Laurie Ryder, a California pediatrician and child advocate. He was the elder brother of actress Olive Deering.

== Select list of appearances ==
- 1944: Winged Victory - Milhauser
- 1947: T-Men - Tony Genaro - aka Tony Galvani
- 1959: Gunsmoke (episode "Passive Resistance") - Hank Voyles
- 1959: The Story on Page One - Lt. Mike Morris
- 1959: Alcoa Presents: One Step Beyond (episode "The Devil's Laughter") - John Marriott
- 1960: Route 66 (episode "The Man on the Monkey Board") - Palmer
- 1961: Bus Stop (episode "I Kiss Your Shadow") - Doug Gibson
- 1963: The Raiders - Capt. Bentonn
- 1963: The Outer Limits (episode "The Borderland") - Edgar Price
- 1964: Combat! (episode "The Hunter") - Capt. Heismann (season 2, episode 24)
- 1964: Invitation to a Gunfighter - Doc Barker
- 1964: Hamlet - Hamlet
- 1965: Gunsmoke (episode "Death Watch") - Newspaperman Flint
- 1965: The Man from U.N.C.L.E. (episode "The See-Paris-and-Die Affair") - Corio
- 1965: The Wild Wild West (TV Series) (season 1, episode 13) (air date: December 10, 1965) "The Night of the Torture Chamber" - Professor Horatio Bolt / (season 2, episode 22) (air date: February 24, 1967) "The Night of the Deadly Bubble" - Captain Philo
- 1966: The Virginian (S5:E5 "Jacob Was a Plain Man") - Ketch
- 1966: Voyage to the Bottom of the Sea (episodes "The Phantom Strikes", "The Return of the Phantom" / "The Heat Monster") - U-boat Captain Gerhardt Krueger / Dr Bergstrom
- 1966: Star Trek (season 1, episode 1 "The Man Trap") - Professor Robert Crater
- 1967: Hotel - Capt. Yolles
- 1967: Invaders - Mr. Nexus (three episodes)
- 1967: The Rat Patrol (episode "The Darkest Raid") - Col. Rudolf Gerschon in season 2, episode 6
- 1967: Mission Impossible (episode "The Diplomat") - Col. Valentin Yetkoff
- 1969: Ironside (episode "Up, Down and Even") - Sgt John Darga
- 1969: True Grit - Goudy
- 1971: Mission Impossible (episode "The Party") - Gregor Mishenko
- 1972: The Legend of Hillbilly John - O. J. Onselm
- 1973: The Stone Killer - Tony Champion
- 1974: W - Investigator
- 1975: Escape to Witch Mountain - Mr. Michael-John, Astrologer
- 1977: Tracks - The Man
- 1979: Buck Rogers In The 25th Century (episode "Escape from Wedded Bliss") - Garridan
