= John Uecker =

American actor and theatre director

John Uecker (June 8, 1946 – April 24, 2022) was an American actor and theatre director, who is best known for his work with the writers James Purdy and Tennessee Williams.

== Early career ==
Uecker studied with Sanford Meisner, Mira Rostova, and Kim Stanley. He also was an assistant to Harold Clurman at the Actors Studio in the Playwrights and Directors Unit. His associations with the Actors Studio and Meisner led to roles in several plays directed by Method and Meisner teachers, including William Alderson and William Esper. He made his Broadway debut in The November People in 1978 and began working in downtown New York City. During this time, he briefly lived with Candy Darling and started to work with James Purdy.

== Tennessee Williams ==
Tennessee Williams attended a workshop of several James Purdy stories adapted by Uecker and hired him as a general assistant and intermittent editor. Uecker assisted Williams in the writing of many of his later one-act plays, including The Chalky White Substance, which was dedicated to Purdy. Uecker later directed the premiere of The Chalky White Substance, pairing the short play with The Travelling Companion under the collective title Williams Guignol.

Uecker was sleeping in the adjoining room on the night that Williams died.

Mr. Williams's body was found Friday morning by his secretary, John Uecker, who shared the playwright's two-room suite. Mr. Uecker said he had heard a noise in Mr. Williams's room at about 11 P.M on Thursday, but did not investigate. At about 10:45 A.M. Friday, Mr. Uecker entered the room and found Mr. Williams lying next to his bed.

Williams' sudden death has continued to haunt Uecker, who has faced accusations of negligence and even murder. Speaking to CBS New York, on the 30th anniversary of the playwright's death, CUNY Professor Annette J. Saddik said Williams had been taking Seconal – a barbiturate derivative – to help him sleep, and also had been drinking the night he died.

"When this happened, John Uecker, who was his companion and assistant at the time, was still around and told the (New York City) Medical Examiner, 'Look, people are going to think it's suicide or AIDS or something bizarre and we don't know what happened,'" Saddik said in the interview. "So the Medical Examiner, said, 'OK, he choked on a bottle cap.' But really, his body just gave up and the eventual diagnosis was intolerance."

Uecker was hired by the Executors of the Williams' Estate (Southeast Banking Corporation and John Eastman), for the purpose of cataloguing, authenticating and preserving Mr. Williams' later work because of Uecker's extensive and first-hand knowledge of the genesis of Mr. Williams' later manuscripts.

In 2010, Uecker spoke at the grand opening of the newly renovated Tennessee Williams Welcome Center in downtown Columbus, Mississippi.

== James Purdy ==
After Williams died, Uecker became more involved as general and literary assistant to James Purdy. Uecker had already been adapting and acting in Purdy's short pieces. From the late 1980s, he began directing Purdy's plays produced by Victoria Linchong. Their first collaboration was on the production of two of Purdy's short plays Heatstroke and Souvenir under the collective title Sun of the Sleepless, featuring Laurence Fishburne and Sheila Dabney. Other credits include the full-length plays The Rivalry of Dolls and Foment. Uecker and Linchong later founded a theater company to produce the work of Purdy.

Uecker collaborated with Purdy on a large-scale, substantive edit of "Gertrude of Stony Island Avenue". Uecker also was associated with the creative development and substantive editing of the last two publications of Purdy's lifetime, "Moe's Villa and Other Stories", a collection of 13 Purdy short-stories, and "Selected Plays", a collection of 4 full-length plays for which Uecker wrote the introduction.

The relationship with Purdy produced 9 full-length plays, 30 short plays, as well as a novel and a book of short stories. Uecker brought the mainstream press' attention back to Purdy by helping to land a lifetime retrospective review of Purdy's work in the New York Times Book Review. The result was a long essay by Gore Vidal, who framed Purdy's as "the outlaw of American fiction" and praised him as "an authentic American genius."

== Other work ==
For eight years in New York City, largely under the auspices of the Running Sun Theater Company, Uecker taught a fusion of the Meisner technique and Method acting, which had been synthesized in exercises developed and taught by the actress Kim Stanley. Uecker coached and/or directed James Gandolfini, Holly Hunter, Brett Butler Laurence Fishburne, Melissa Gilbert, Sam Trammell, and Jason Hale.
