= Jason Hale =

Jason Hale may refer to:

- Jason Hale (actor) (born 1971), American actor, theatre director, and teacher
- Jason Hale (politician) (born 1969), Canadian politician
