= Victoria Linchong =

American screenwriter, producer, actress and director

Victoria Linchong (Chinese: 林鍾維香) is an American screenwriter, producer, actress and director working in both theater and film.

== Early life ==
Victoria Linchong was born in New York City and lived in Taiwan for two years at a young age. She attended Hunter College High School and began working at Theater for the New City as an actress in their summer street theater when she was fourteen. Rebelling against her traditional Taiwanese family, she left home at the age of sixteen and lived in the basement of the theater, where she became acquainted with many pioneers of Off-Off Broadway, including several writers who were part of the Caffe Cino.

== Career ==
=== Theater ===
Linchong is primarily known for her work with the writer James Purdy, which began at the age of seventeen when she met actor/director John Uecker. Although she had some success as a teenage actress, most notably appearing in the Obie Award-winning play Hot Keys by Jeff Weiss, she was frustrated with the roles then available to Asian-American actresses and teamed up with Uecker to produce Purdy's Sun of the Sleepless, which featured Laurence Fishburne.

Linchong and Uecker went on to produce two other James Purdy productions at Theater for the New City, Til the Eagle Hollers with Jane Smith and The Rivalry of Dolls, before forming Running Sun Theater Company, dedicated to producing Purdy's work. The company's inaugural production was Williams' Guignol, the world premiere of two short plays by Tennessee Williams - Traveling Companion and Chalky White Substance - which featured Bill Rice and Sam Trammell. The production was instrumental in inspiring other companies to produce Williams's later works. She produced one last play for Running Sun Theater Company, Foment by James Purdy, featuring David Zayas who was then beginning his career, before the company disbanded.

Linchong's other notable credit during this time includes Production Coordinator for Stop the War: A Festival for Peace in the Middle East, a 12-hour artistic protest against the Gulf War that won an Obie Award.

More recently, Linchong founded the theater and film company Direct Arts. In 2010, she produced, directed and acted in Paper Angels by Genny Lim. The play was performed outdoors in San Francisco's Chinatown and won Best Site Specific Show in the San Francisco Fringe Festival.

=== Film ===
Linchong's first short film, Double Dealing, which she wrote, directed and acted in, was a finalist for Asian Cinevision's 2nd Annual 72 Hour Film Shootout in 2005.

She began working on the documentary Almost Home: Taiwan in 2008.

=== Other work ===
Linchong was one of the founding members of the James Purdy Society.

She was the betelnut beauty for an art installation by Annamarie Ho, which recreated a betelnut kiosk on a New York City street corner in 2008.

She is also a freelance writer and theater reviewer whose work has been published in NY Theatre Review, New York Magazine, Salem Press and several online publications, including nytheatre.com.
