= Cat on a Hot Tin Roof (1984 film) =

1984 adaptation of play by Tennessee Williams

- Genre: Drama
- Based on: Cat on a Hot Tin Roof; 1955 play by Tennessee Williams
- Directed by: Jack Hofsiss
- Starring: Jessica Lange; Tommy Lee Jones; Rip Torn; Kim Stanley; Penny Fuller; David Dukes
- Theme music composer: Tom Scott
- Country of origin: United States
- Original language: English

Production
- Executive producer: Lou LaMonte
- Producer: Phylis Geller
- Editor: Roy Stewart
- Running time: 144 minutes
- Production companies: Showtime Entertainment; American Playhouse; International Television Group; KCET

Original release
- Network: PBS
- Release: August 19, 1984

Cat on a Hot Tin Roof is a 1984 American made-for-television drama film directed by Jack Hofsiss, and starring Jessica Lange, Tommy Lee Jones, Rip Torn, Kim Stanley, David Dukes, and Penny Fuller. The script, written by Tennessee Williams, is based on his 1974 revival of his Pulitzer Prize-winning play of the same name.

Produced by American Playhouse, the film originally premiered on PBS on August 19, 1984. The production and some of the actors were nominated for awards.

== Plot ==
The Pollitt family gathers at their Mississippi plantation. The head of the family, Big Daddy, is dying. Big Daddy's sons, Brick and Gooper, and Brick's sensuous wife, Maggie, are vying for his inheritance.

== Adaption ==
This adaptation, written by Williams, restored the sexual innuendos that were muted in the screenplay for the 1958 film, which was written by others. The script is the substantially revised and restored version that Williams had made for the 1974 Broadway revival, including the ending, which suggests that the protagonists' future together is anything but certain.

== Cast ==
- Jessica Lange as Margaret "Maggie" Pollitt
- Tommy Lee Jones as Brick Pollitt
- Rip Torn as Harvey "Big Daddy" Pollitt
- Kim Stanley as Ida "Big Mama" Pollitt
- Penny Fuller as Mae Flynn Pollitt
- David Dukes as Cooper "Gooper" Pollitt
- Macon McCalman as Reverend Tooker
- Thomas Hill as Dr. Baugh
- Fran Bennett as Sookey
- Ami Foster as Polly Pollitt

== Awards and nominations ==
Both Stanley and Fuller were nominated for Emmy Awards for Outstanding Supporting Actress in a Miniseries, and Stanley won. The film was a re-union of sorts for Stanley and Lange, who had received Oscar nominations for playing mother and daughter in 1982's Frances. The film was also nominated for the Primetime Emmy Award for Outstanding Lighting Design / Lighting Direction for a Variety Special.

The film was nominated for five CableACE Awards, specifically, Actor in a Theatrical or Dramatic Special (Rip Torn), Art Direction on Video Tape (John Retsek, David Jenkins, Showtime Networks), Theatrical Special (Lou LaMonte, Phylis Geller, Showtime Networks), Writing a Theatrical or Dramatic Special (Tennessee Williams, Showtime Networks), and Lighting Direction on Video Tape (Danny Franks, Ken Dettling, Showtime Networks).

== Critical reception ==
The New York Times wrote, "Once again, Tennessee Williams's Cat on a Hot Tin Roof is being decked out in a promising production and, once again, the play itself flounders."
