= Ricki Noel Lander =

American actress and model

- Education: Florida International University
- Occupation: Actress
- Partner(s): Robert Kraft (2012–2018)
- Children: 2

Ricki Noel Lander is an American actress, model, designer and entrepreneur.

== Early life and education ==
Lander grew up in Salt Lake City, Utah. As a child, she was active in dance, musical theater, and acting. When she was 15, she moved to Los Angeles, California, and trained with the Los Angeles Classical Ballet and later toured Japan as a dancer. She graduated cum laude while attending on Academic and Artistic scholarships from Florida International University in Miami with a Bachelor of Arts in Dance and a Bachelor of Science in Mass Communications. She later studied at Mike Nichols' New Actor's Workshop in New York City and at Uta Hagen’s HB Studio also in New York City.

== Career ==
=== Television and film ===
She has appeared in the television shows CSI: Crime Scene Investigation, Ugly Betty, Dirt, The Class and Prison Break. In 2011, she played a goblin disguised as a fairy in the fourth season opener of the HBO series True Blood alongside Anna Paquin. She completed an episode of CBS series Unforgettable and guest starred on the season 5 opener of Blue Bloods. In 2008, she played a flight attendant in the blockbuster movie Iron Man. Later in 2008, she starred as the lead character in The Harsh Life of Veronica Lambert (also known as 5 Nights in Hollywood) with Ed O'Ross, Bart Johnson, and Elena Satine. In 2013, she appeared in the Farrelly Brothers Comedy Movie 43; where she was cast in the segment 'Truth or Dare' playing the nurse to Halle Berry's character. Her most recent role was in 2015 in Ant-Man with Paul Rudd.

She works as correspondent for the exploration series The Travel Detective alongside travel guru Peter Greenberg. In 2014 she served as a correspondent and producer on the PBS documentary Israel: The Royal Tour, filming and narrating behind-the-scenes footage with Prime Minister Benjamin Netanyahu and First Lady Sara Netanyahu.

=== Fashion ===
While pursuing her acting career, Lander spent several years under contract with Ford Models, shooting for a variety of brands and publications.

Starting in January 2014, sports e-commerce conglomerate Fanatics and FansEdge began retailing a collection of women's fangear for College, MLB, NHL, NBA, and NFL designed by Lander called Let Loose By RNL.

=== Philanthropy ===
Lander formerly served on the board of directors for the New York City Ballet and the board of trustees for the Alvin Ailey Dance Company. In 2016 she co-chaired the New York City Ballet Fall Fashion Gala along with fellow hosts Sarah Jessica Parker and Daisy Maeda.

== Personal life ==
In 2012, Lander began dating the American billionaire and business magnate Robert Kraft, the chairman and CEO of The Kraft Group and owner of the NFL's New England Patriots. In July 2012, Kraft assisted Lander in creating an audition video for a role in The Internship, a film with Vince Vaughn and Owen Wilson, and the video was posted on the internet. Kraft said, "I never intended that it would be made public and I regret that it has."

Lander's daughter was born in the fall of 2017. While there was speculation that Kraft was the father, he denied paternity of the child when the birth was announced in March 2018. Their relationship ended in 2018.

== Filmography ==
| Year | Title | Role | Notes |
|---|---|---|---|
| 2006 | The Achievers | Dream Girl | Uncredited |
| 2007 | Cult | Cult Member #5 | |
| 2008 | Iron Man | Flight Attendant #1 | |
| 2009 | The Harsh Life of Veronica Lambert | Veronica Lambert | |
| 2011 | Life Happens | Wanda the Waitress | Uncredited |
| 2012 | A Green Story | Waitress | |
| 2012 | Lost Angeles | Somer | |
| 2013 | Movie 43 | Nurse Elizabeth | (segment "Truth or Dare") |
| 2015 | Ant-Man | Gorgeous Blonde | |
