= The New Actors Workshop =

Coordinates: 40.74950°N 73.99454°W

- United States

Information
- Type: Private
- Established: 1988
- Founders: George Morrison; Mike Nichols; Paul Sills
- Website: http://www.newactorsworkshop.com

The New Actors Workshop was a two-year acting conservatory in New York City founded by Master Teachers Mike Nichols, George Morrison and Paul Sills in 1988. The school offered a unique, dual-track curriculum combining Stanislavski-based technique with Viola Spolin Theater Games. The workshop stopped accepting students in 2010.

== The founders ==
Sills, Morrison, and Nichols enjoyed a long association dating back to the 1950s at the University of Chicago. Their experience convinced them that there was a unique value for the actor in the double challenge of performance improvisation and Stanislavski-based training, and they founded The Workshop specifically to offer this powerful experience to a new generation of actors.

== Performances ==
There were different types of performances throughout the year in which students participated.

=== Friday Night Improv ===
Students of the workshop played Spolin theatre games for an audience. These shows were free and open to the public.

=== Scene Nights ===
At the end of their first year, students performed for family and friends in a New Actors Workshop Scene Night.

=== Story Theatre ===
At the end of their second year, students went into a rehearsal period with a guest director. This production was most often a Story Theater show, a genre invented by Paul Sills in the 1960s. Guest directors included Paul Sills, Gene Hackman, Diane Paulus, Shira Piven, David Turner, Lester Thomas Shane, K Tanzer, Carol Sills

== Notable alumni ==
- Diane Paulus, director Hair (musical)
- Ricki Noel Lander, actress
- Kim D'Armond, actress
- Michael Cassidy, actor (The OC, Batman V. Superman)
- Josh Ruben, actor/director (Heart Eyes, Werewolves Within, DropoutTV)
