= Ruth Stage (theatre) =

Nonprofit entertainment group

Ruth Stage is an American nonprofit professional theatre and entertainment organization based in Toms River, New Jersey and performing works in Asbury Park, NJ and New York City. They are the first group in the history of theatre to perform the Tennessee Williams play Cat on a Hot Tin Roof as an off Broadway production, having done so in both 2022 and 2023. The productions were directed by Joe Rosario, and starred Matt de Rogatis as "Brick" and two-time Tony Award nominee Alison Fraser as "Big Mama".
