= Cat on a Hot Tin Roof =

1955 stage play by Tennessee Williams

- First edition cover (New Directions)
- Original language: English
- Written by: Tennessee Williams
- Characters: Margaret; Brick; Big Daddy; Big Mama; Mae/"Sister Woman"; Gooper/"Brother Man"; Doctor Baugh; Reverend Tooker
- Subject: Death, mendacity, relationships, loneliness, homosexuality, alcoholism
- Genre: Drama, Southern Gothic
- Setting: Brick and Margaret's room on the Pollitt plantation in Mississippi

Premiere
- Date: March 24, 1955
- Place: Morosco Theatre; New York City, New York

Cat on a Hot Tin Roof is a 1955 American three-act play by Tennessee Williams. The play, an adaptation of his 1952 short story "Three Players of a Summer Game", was written between 1953 and 1955. One of Williams's more famous works and his personal favorite, it won the Pulitzer Prize for Drama in 1955. Set in the "plantation home in the Mississippi Delta" of Big Daddy Pollitt, a wealthy cotton tycoon, the play examines the relationships among members of Big Daddy's family, primarily between his son Brick and Maggie "the Cat", Brick's wife.

Cat on a Hot Tin Roof features motifs such as social mores, greed, superficiality, mendacity, decay, sexual desire, repression, and death. The dialogue throughout is often written using eye dialect (nonstandard spelling) intended to represent accents of the Southern United States. The original production starred Barbara Bel Geddes, Burl Ives, and Ben Gazzara. The play was adapted as a film of the same name in 1958, starring Elizabeth Taylor and Paul Newman as Maggie and Brick, with Ives and Madeleine Sherwood recreating their stage roles.

Williams made substantial excisions and alterations to the play for a revival in 1974. This has been the version used for most subsequent revivals, which have been numerous.

== Plot ==
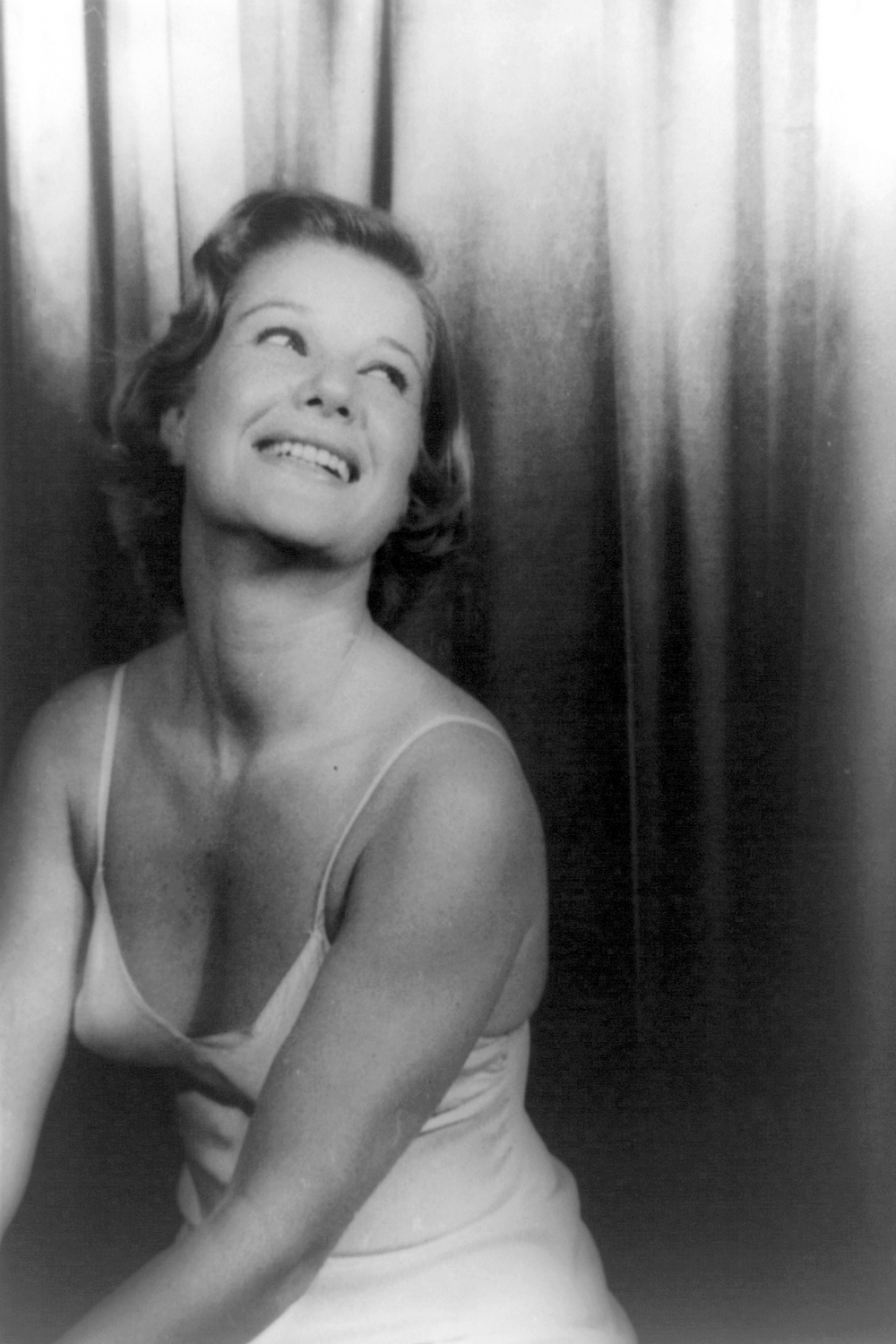
Barbara Bel Geddes as Maggie in the original Broadway production of Cat on a Hot Tin Roof (1955)

A family in the American South is in crisis, especially the husband and wife, Brick and Margaret (usually called Maggie or "Maggie the Cat"), and the crisis unspools with Brick's family over the course of one evening's gathering at the family plantation in Mississippi. The party celebrates the birthday of patriarch Big Daddy Pollitt, "the Delta's biggest cotton-planter", and his return from the Ochsner Clinic with what he has been told is a clean bill of health. All family members (except Big Daddy and his wife, Big Mama) are aware of Big Daddy's true diagnosis: he is dying of cancer. His family has lied to Big Daddy and Big Mama to spare them pain on the patriarch's birthday, but throughout the course of the play, it becomes clear that the Pollitt family has long constructed a web of deceit for itself.

Maggie, determined and beautiful, has escaped a childhood of poverty to marry into the wealthy Pollitts, but finds herself unfulfilled. The family is aware that Brick has not slept with Maggie for a long time, which has strained their marriage. Brick, an aging football hero, infuriates her by ignoring his brother Gooper's attempts to gain control of the family fortune. Brick's indifference and his drinking have escalated with the suicide of his football buddy Skipper. Maggie fears that Brick's malaise will ensure that Gooper and his wife, Mae, inherit Big Daddy's estate.

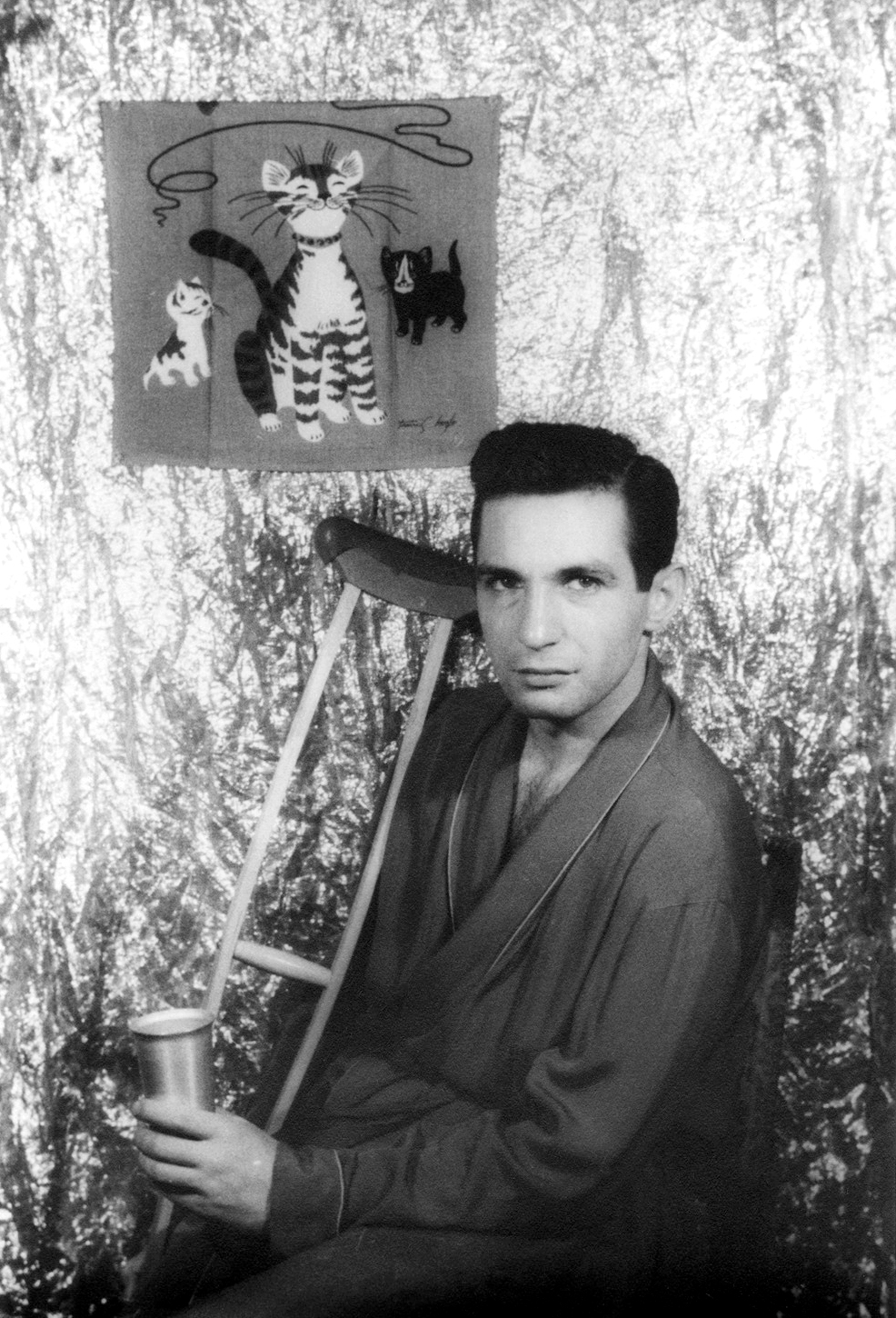
Ben Gazzara as Brick in the original Broadway production of Cat on a Hot Tin Roof (1955)

Over the evening, each member of the family faces the issues they have bottled up inside. Big Daddy attempts a reconciliation with the alcoholic Brick. Both Big Daddy and Maggie separately confront Brick about the true nature of his close friendship with Skipper, which appears to be the source of Brick's sorrow and the cause of his alcoholism. Brick explains to Big Daddy that the friendship troubled Maggie, who jealously believed it had a romantic undercurrent, and says Skipper took Maggie to bed to prove her wrong but could not complete the act, raising inner doubts that made him "snap". Brick also reveals that, shortly before his suicide, Skipper confessed his attraction to Brick, but Brick rejected him.

Disgusted by the family's mendacity, Brick tells Big Daddy that the report from the clinic about his condition was falsified for his sake. Big Daddy storms out of the room, leading the rest to drift inside. Maggie, Brick, Mae, Gooper, and Doc Baugh (the family's physician) decide to tell Big Mama the truth about her husband's illness, and she is devastated by the news. Gooper and Mae start to discuss the division of the Pollitt estate. Big Mama defends her husband from their proposals.

Big Daddy reappears and makes known his plans to die peacefully. Attempting to secure Brick's inheritance, Maggie tells him she is pregnant. Gooper and Mae know this is a lie, but Big Mama and Big Daddy believe that Maggie "has life". When they are alone again, Maggie locks away the liquor and promises Brick that she will "make the lie true".

== Themes ==
=== Falsehoods and untruths ===
Mendacity is a recurring theme in the play. Brick uses the word to express his disgust with the "lies and liars" he sees around him, and with complicated rules of social conduct in Southern society and culture. Big Daddy says that Brick's disgust with mendacity is really disgust with himself for rejecting Skipper before his suicide. Except for Brick, the entire family lies to Big Daddy and Big Mama about his terminal cancer. Furthermore, Big Daddy lies to his wife, and Gooper and Mae exhibit avaricious motives in their attempt to secure Big Daddy's estate.

In some cases, characters refuse to believe certain statements, leading them to believe they are lies. A recurring phrase is the line, "Wouldn't it be funny if that was true?", said by both Big Daddy and Brick after Big Mama and Maggie (respectively) proclaim their love. The characters' statements of feeling are no longer clear-cut truths or lies; instead, they become subject to greater or lesser certainty. This phrase is the last line of the play as originally written by Williams and again in the 1974 version.

=== Facing death ===
How humans deal with death is also a focus of this play, as are the futility and nihilism some feel when confronted with imminent mortality. Similar ideas are found in Dylan Thomas's "Do Not Go Gentle into That Good Night", which Williams excerpted and added as an epigraph to his 1974 version. Thomas wrote the poem to his dying father.

Additionally, in one of his many drafts, in a footnote on Big Daddy's action in the third act, Williams deems Cat on a Hot Tin Roof a "play which says only one affirmative thing about 'Man's Fate': that he has it still in his power not to squeal like a pig but to keep a tight mouth about it."

== Stage productions ==
=== Original production ===
The original production, which opened on Broadway at the Morosco Theater on March 24, 1955, was directed by Elia Kazan and starred Barbara Bel Geddes as Maggie, Ben Gazzara as Brick, Burl Ives as Big Daddy, Mildred Dunnock as Big Mama, Pat Hingle as Gooper, and Madeleine Sherwood as Mae. The production first ran for two weeks at the Forrest Theatre in Philadelphia, Pennsylvania, beginning on March 7. Bel Geddes was the only cast member nominated for a Tony Award, and Kazan was nominated for Best Director of a Play. Kazan had enormous power in the industry at the time, sufficient to convince Williams to rewrite the third act to Kazan's liking. Kazan requested that Maggie be shown as more sympathetic, the dying Big Daddy make a reappearance, and Brick undergo some sort of moral awakening. Williams capitulated, but when the play was published later that year by New Directions Publishing, it included two versions of act three, the original and the Broadway revision, with his accompanying "Note of Explanation". For its 1974 revival, Williams made further revisions to all three acts, and New Directions published that version of the play in 1975.

Both Ives and Sherwood reprised their roles in the 1958 film version. The cast also featured the southern blues duo Brownie McGhee and Sonny Terry and had as Gazzara's understudy the young Cliff Robertson. When Gazzara left the play, Jack Lord replaced him. Others from the original Broadway production included R. G. Armstrong as Doctor Baugh, Fred Stewart as Reverend Tooker, Janice Dunn as Trixie, Seth Edwards as Sonny, Maxwell Glanville as Lacey, Pauline Hahn as Dixie, Darryl Richard as Buster, Eva Vaughn Smith as Daisy, and Musa Williams as Sookey.

In London, the play was directed by Peter Hall and opened at the Comedy Theatre on January 30, 1958. Kim Stanley starred as Maggie, Paul Massie as Brick, and Leo McKern as Big Daddy.

=== Revivals ===
An acclaimed 1974 revival by the American Shakespeare Theatre featured Elizabeth Ashley (Maggie), Keir Dullea (Brick), Fred Gwynne (Big Daddy), Kate Reid and Charles Siebert and later transferred to Broadway's ANTA Theater. Ashley was nominated for a Tony Award. Williams included a revised third act and made substantial revisions elsewhere. When this production moved from Connecticut to Broadway, the part of Lacey was omitted and the number of Mae and Gooper's children was reduced to three. In that same decade, John Carradine—who claimed to be Williams's original choice for the role in 1955—and Mercedes McCambridge toured in a road company production as Big Daddy and Big Mama.

The 1988 London National Theatre production, directed by Howard Davies, starred Ian Charleson (Brick), Lindsay Duncan (Maggie), Barbara Leigh-Hunt (, and Eric Porter. The Observer's theater critic Michael Ratcliffe offered qualified praise for the production, especially admiring Porter's performance as Big Daddy and the play's second act, while critiquing the first act and Duncan's speaking style. In 2012, Michael Billington referred to the production as the first "British production that finally did full justice to Williams's symphonic play."

Cat returned to Broadway in 1990 with a revival also directed by Howard Davies. The production ran for 149 performances and grossed $6.8 million. Kathleen Turner (Maggie), Charles Durning (Big Daddy), and Polly Holliday (Big Mama) each earned Tony nominations for their performances, with Durning the sole winner.

A 2001 production at the Lyric Shaftesbury, London, was the first West End revival since 1958. Directed by Anthony Page, the production featured Brendan Fraser (Brick), Frances O'Connor (Maggie), Ned Beatty (Big Daddy) and Gemma Jones (Big Mama). It also included Abigail McKern—daughter of London's original Big Daddy, Leo McKern—as Mae. Reviews were generally positive, especially regarding Beatty's performance.

Page's production shifted to Broadway for a 2003 staging that starred Ashley Judd (Maggie) and Jason Patric (Brick). Though it was a financial success that recouped its investment, the revival received mixed reviews. Ben Brantley panned Patric and Judd's performances as stilted, but praised Ned Beatty as Big Daddy and Margo Martindale as Big Mama. John Simon had greater praise for Judd—as "scrupulously dedicated"—but likewise praised Beatty and Martindale while lambasting Patric. Martindale earned the show's sole Tony nomination. The production closed early in March 2004—after 145 performances and an $8.9 million gross—due to Judd sustaining an ankle injury that prevented her from performing.

A 2003 revival at the Belvoir St Theatre in Sydney was directed by Simon Stone and starred Jacqueline McKenzie as Maggie, Ewen Leslie as Brick, and Marshall Napier as Big Daddy. This production was a box-office hit, with the season extended to the Theatre Royal, Sydney.

A 2004 production at the Kennedy Center in Washington, D.C., featured Mary Stuart Masterson as Maggie, Jeremy Davidson as Brick, George Grizzard as Big Daddy, Dana Ivey as Big Mama, and Emily Skinner as Mae. Shortly afterward, Masterson and Davidson married.

In 2008, an all-black production by first-time director Debbie Allen opened on Broadway. Terrence Howard made his Broadway debut as Brick, with James Earl Jones as Big Daddy, Phylicia Rashad as Big Mama, Anika Noni Rose as Maggie and Lisa Arrindell Anderson as Mae. The staging was originally planned for January 1995 with Jones as Big Daddy and Lloyd Richards as director, but Broadway theaters declined to host it for 13 years. Michael Musto gave the production a mixed review. Ben Brantley effusively praised Rose's performance, but labelled the revival unbalanced and "flabby." The play earned no Tony nominations, which The New York Times identified as a trend of Tony-voters rejecting the season's productions that were led by Hollywood actors. The play was financially successful, grossing $11.9 million from 125 performances.The producing team announced it had recouped its $2.1 million capitalization within 12 weeks.

In November 2009, the production moved to London's West End starring Adrian Lester (Brick) and Sanaa Lathan (Maggie), with both Jones and Rashad reprising their Broadway roles. The West End production received the 2010 Laurence Olivier Award for Best Revival of a Play and Jones received a nomination for Best Actor.

In January 2011, a production to mark Williams's 100th birthday was presented with an American cast at the English Theater in Vienna, Austria. In 2011, the play was performed at the Shaw Festival in Niagara-on-the-Lake, Canada, starring Maya O’Connell as Maggie and Gray Powell as Brick.

Rob Ashford directed a 2013 Broadway revival that opened at the Richard Rodgers Theatre in January 2013. Featuring Ciarán Hinds (Big Daddy), Debra Monk (Big Mama), Benjamin Walker (Brick), and Scarlett Johansson (Maggie), the production ran for 86 performances as a limited engagement. Producer Stuart Thompson staged the production at Johansson's request after she sought to return to Broadway following her Tony win for A View from the Bridge. She originally considered Williams's The Glass Menagerie, but didn't respond to the lead character. Walker—who helped with the readthrough of Menagerie—suggested she fit Maggie in Cat better. Ben Brantley reviewed Johannson's performance as flawed, but also an "undeniable life force [...] and lifeline" for an otherwise lackluster show. Newsday's Linda Winer panned Johansson's performance as too restrained, with the rest of the show "faceless, respectable, and dull." The production earned $11.9 million during its run, though the production team said that they failed to recoup their investment.

A 2014 production directed by James Dacre played at Royal & Derngate (Northampton), the Royal Exchange Theatre (Manchester), and Northern Stage (Newcastle upon Tyne), with an original score by White Lies bassist Charles Cave. It featured Mariah Gale (Maggie), Charles Aitken (Brick), Daragh O'Malley (Big Daddy), and Kim Criswell (Big Mama). Paul Vallely praised the production for its subtlety.

The Berkshire Theatre Festival produced the play in 2016, under the direction of David Auburn, with Michael Raymond-James (Brick), Rebecca Brooksher (Maggie), Linda Gehringer (Big Mama), and Jim Beaver (Big Daddy). A review in the local publication, The Berkshire Edge, rendered the production "questionable" and especially criticized the play's unfaithfulness to the material and Raymond-James's unsympathetic performance.

The Young Vic's 2017 production—directed by Benedict Andrews and starring Sienna Miller (Maggie), Jack O'Connell (Brick), Colm Meaney (Big Daddy), Lisa Palfrey (Big Mama), Hayley Squires (Mae), and Brian Gleeson (Gooper)—was filmed at the Apollo Theatre for National Theatre Live. On March 10, 2021, the filmed production was added to the National Theatre Live's streaming service: National Theatre at Home.

In 2022, the Tennessee Williams estate granted the production company Ruth Stage the right to perform the show off-Broadway for the first time in the play's history. The show ran to largely positive reviews for 35 performances at the Theatre at St. Clements in Hell's Kitchen. Because of the show's success, the estate granted an unprecedented re-engagement for 41 more performances at the same theater in the winter of 2023.

A London revival directed by Rebecca Frecknall opened at the Almeida Theatre in December 2024, starring Daisy Edgar-Jones as Maggie and Kingsley Ben-Adir as Brick. Arifa Akbar praised elements of the production, but ultimately decreed it "a production that you admire rather than one that moves you."

Director Sam Gold and production company Seaview announced on April 21, 2026, that he would direct a new Broadway revival in spring 2027. Dates and casting are currently to be announced.

== Notable casts ==
Character	Broadway	West End	Broadway Revival	Broadway Revival	Broadway Revival	Broadway Revival	Broadway Revival	London Revival	Off-Broadway Revival	London Revival
Character	1955	1958	1974	1990	2003	2008	2013	2018	2022	2024
Margaret	Barbara Bel Geddes	Kim Stanley	Elizabeth Ashley	Kathleen Turner	Ashley Judd	Anika Noni Rose	Scarlett Johansson	Sienna Miller	Sonoya Mizuno	Daisy Edgar-Jones
Brick	Ben Gazzara	Paul Massie	Keir Dullea	Daniel Hugh Kelly	Jason Patric	Terrence Howard	Benjamin Walker	Jack O'Connell	Matt de Rogatis	Kingsley Ben-Adir
Big Daddy	Burl Ives	Leo McKern	Fred Gwynne	Charles Durning	Ned Beatty	James Earl Jones	Ciarán Hinds	Colm Meaney	Christian Jules le Blanc	Lennie James
Big Mama	Mildred Dunnock	Bee Duffell	Kate Reid	Polly Holliday	Margo Martindale	Phylicia Rashad	Debra Monk	Lisa Palfrey	Alison Fraser	Clare Burt
Gooper	Pat Hingle	Alan Tilvern	Charles Siebert	Kevin O'Rourke	Michael Mastro	Giancarlo Esposito	Michael Park	Brian Gleeson	Adam Dodway	Seb Carrington
Mae	Madeleine Sherwood	Daphne Anderson	Joan Pape	Debra Jo Rupp	Amy Hohn	Lisa Arrindell Anderson	Emily Bergl	Hayley Squires	Tiffan Borelli	Pearl Chanda
Doctor Baugh	R.G. Armstrong	Launce Maraschal	William Larsen	Jerome Dempsey	Edwin C. Owens	Count Stovall	Brian Reddy	Richard Hansell	Jim Kempner	Guy Burgess
Reverend Tooker	Fred Stewart	Roger Winton	Wyman Pendleton	Nesbitt Blaisdell	Patrick Collins	Lou Myers	Vin Knight	Michael J. Shannon	Milton Elliott	Derek Hagen

== Adaptations ==
The big-screen adaptation was released by MGM in 1958 and starred Elizabeth Taylor, Paul Newman, Judith Anderson, and Jack Carson, with Burl Ives and Madeleine Sherwood reprising their stage roles. Critics said that film censors and directors diminished the motion picture's authenticity. The Hays Code limited Brick's portrayal of sexual desire for Skipper and diminished the play's critique of homophobia and sexism. According to critic Emanuel Levy, George Cukor was initially assigned to direct the film, "though issues of censorship—homosexuality in particular—prevented him from doing it". Director Richard Brooks's version was criticized for toning down the play, specifically eliminating the homosexual theme. The film substituted hazy hero-worship for Williams's strong suggestion of homosexuality. Williams was reportedly unhappy with the screenplay, which removed almost all the homosexual themes and revised the third act section to include a lengthy scene of reconciliation between Brick and Big Daddy. Paul Newman, the film's star, also stated his disappointment with the adaptation.

The film was highly acclaimed and was nominated for several Academy Awards, including Best Picture. Elizabeth Taylor and Paul Newman both received Oscar nominations for their performances.

In 1976, a TV version was produced, starring the then husband-and-wife team of Natalie Wood and Robert Wagner, and featuring Laurence Olivier as Big Daddy and Maureen Stapleton as Big Mama.

In 1984, another TV version was produced by American Playhouse, starring Jessica Lange, Tommy Lee Jones, Rip Torn, Kim Stanley, David Dukes, and Penny Fuller. This adaptation, directed by Jack Hofsiss, revived the sexual innuendos that the 1958 film muted. Both Stanley and Fuller were nominated for the Emmy Award for Outstanding Supporting Actress in a Miniseries, and Stanley won.

The 2016 Bollywood movie Kapoor & Sons drew its inspiration from the play.

A new film adaptation was announced in 2021, with Antoine Fuqua directing and producing. The producers of the 2008 Broadway revival, Stephen C. Byrd and Alia Jones-Harvey, will also produce.

== Awards and nominations ==
=== Original Broadway production ===
Year	Award ceremony	Category	Nominee	Result
1955	New York Drama Critics' Circle	Best American Play	Tennessee Williams	Won
1955	Pulitzer Prize	Drama (Note: Joseph Pulitzer Jr. pressured the prize jury into presenting the Prize to Cat on a Hot Tin Roof, which the jury considered the weakest of the five shortlisted nominees ("amateurishly constructed... from the stylistic points of view annoyingly pretentious"), instead of Clifford Odets' The Flowering Peach (their preferred choice) or The Bad Seed, their second choice.)	Tennessee Williams	Won
1956	Tony Award	Best Play		Nominated
1956	Tony Award	Best Actress in a Play	Barbara Bel Geddes	Nominated
1956	Tony Award	Best Director	Elia Kazan	Nominated
1956	Tony Award	Best Scenic Design	Jo Mielziner	Nominated

=== 1974 Broadway revival ===
Year	Award ceremony	Category	Nominee	Result
1975	Tony Award	Best Actress in a Play	Elizabeth Ashley	Nominated
1975	Drama Desk Award	Outstanding Actress in a Play	Elizabeth Ashley	Nominated
1975	Drama Desk Award	Outstanding Set Design	John Conklin	Nominated

=== 1990 Broadway revival ===
Year	Award ceremony	Category	Nominee	Result
1990	Tony Award	Best Actress in a Play	Kathleen Turner	Nominated
1990	Tony Award	Best Featured Actor in a Play	Charles Durning	Won
1990	Tony Award	Best Featured Actress in a Play	Polly Holliday	Nominated
1990	Drama Desk Award	Outstanding Revival		Nominated
1990	Drama Desk Award	Outstanding Featured Actor in a Play	Charles Durning	Won
1990	Outer Critics Circle Award	Outstanding Revival of a Play		Won
1990	Outer Critics Circle Award	Outstanding Actor in a Play	Charles Durning	Nominated
1990	Outer Critics Circle Award	Outstanding Actress in a Play	Kathleen Turner	Nominated

=== 2003 Broadway revival ===
Year	Award ceremony	Category	Nominee	Result
2004	Tony Award	Best Featured Actress in a Play	Margo Martindale	Nominated
2004	Drama Desk Award	Outstanding Featured Actor in a Play	Ned Beatty	Won
2004	Drama Desk Award	Outstanding Featured Actress in a Play	Margo Martindale	Nominated
2004	Outer Critics Circle Award	Outstanding Featured Actor in a Play	Ned Beatty	Won
2004	Outer Critics Circle Award	Outstanding Featured Actress in a Play	Margo Martindale	Nominated
2004	Drama League Award	Distinguished Revival of a Play		Nominated

=== 2008 Broadway revival ===
Year	Award ceremony	Category	Nominee	Result
2008	Outer Critics Circle Award	Outstanding Featured Actor in a Play	James Earl Jones	Won
