= A Far Country (play) =

Play by Henry Denker

- Original language: English
- Written by: Henry Denker

Premiere
- Date: April 4, 1961
- Place: Broadway, Music Box Theatre

A Far Country is a play by Henry Denker. The work premiered on Broadway at the Music Box Theatre on April 4, 1961, where it closed on November 25, 1961, after 271 performances. Produced by Roger L. Stevens and Joel Schenker, the production was directed by Alfred Ryder and used sets by Donald Oenslager and costumes by Ann Roth. Lead actress Kim Stanley (Ryder's wife at the time) was nominated for a Tony Award for her portrayal of Elizabeth von Ritter.

== Awards and nominations ==
=== Original Broadway production ===
Year	Award	Category	Nominee	Result
1962	Tony Award	Best Actress in a Play	Kim Stanley	Nominated
