= Kim Stanley =

American actress (1925–2001)

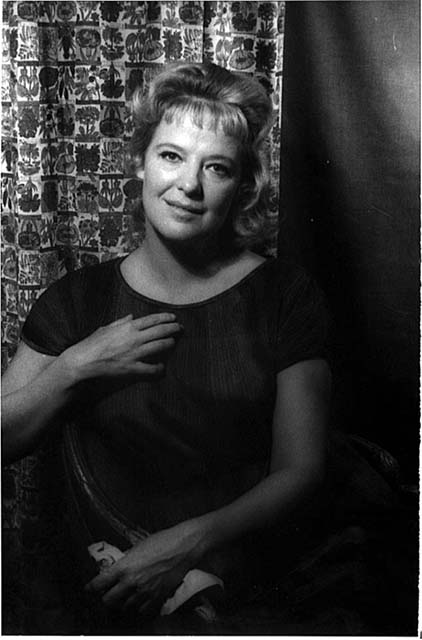
- Stanley in 1961
- Born: Patricia Reid; February 11, 1925; Tularosa, New Mexico, U.S.
- Died: August 20, 2001 (aged 76); Santa Fe, New Mexico, U.S.
- Education: Actors Studio; University of New Mexico
- Occupation: Actress
- Years active: 1950–1985
- Spouses: Bruce Hall (m. 1945; div. 1946) Curt Conway (m. 1949; div. 1956) Alfred Ryder (m. 1958; div. 1964) Joseph Siegel (m. 1964; div. 1967)
- Children: 3

Kim Stanley (born Patricia Reid; February 11, 1925 – August 20, 2001) was an American actress who was primarily active in television and theatre but also had occasional film performances.

She began her acting career in theatre and subsequently attended the Actors Studio in New York. She received the 1952 Theatre World Award for her role in The Chase (1952), and starred in the Broadway productions of Picnic (1953) and Bus Stop (1955). Stanley was nominated for the Tony Award for Best Actress in a Play for her roles in A Touch of the Poet (1959) and A Far Country (1962).

In the 1950s, Stanley was a prolific performer in television; she later progressed to film, with a well-received performance in The Goddess (1958). She was the narrator of To Kill a Mockingbird (1962), and starred in Séance on a Wet Afternoon (1964), for which she won the New York Film Critics Circle Award for Best Actress and was nominated for the Academy Award for Best Actress. She was less active during the remainder of her career; two of her later film successes were as the mother of Frances Farmer in Frances (1982), for which she received a nomination for the Academy Award for Best Supporting Actress, and as Pancho Barnes in The Right Stuff (1983). Stanley received a Primetime Emmy Award for Outstanding Supporting Actress – Miniseries or a Movie for her performance as Big Mama in a television adaptation of Cat on a Hot Tin Roof in 1985. That same year, she was inducted into the American Theatre Hall of Fame.

== Early life ==
Stanley was born in Tularosa, New Mexico, the daughter of Ann (née Miller), an interior decorator, and J. T. Reid, a professor of philosophy and education at the University of New Mexico, located in Albuquerque. Her father was of Irish or Scottish descent, born and raised in Texas, where he met her mother (who was of German and English ancestry). She had three older brothers (Howard Clinton Reid, a psychiatrist; Kenneth Reid, killed in pilot training during World War II; and Justin Truman Reid, a lawyer); and a half-sister (Carol Ann Reid). She was a drama major at the University of New Mexico, and later studied at the Pasadena Playhouse and adopted her maternal grandmother's surname as her stage name.

== Career ==
=== Theatre ===
Stanley was a successful Broadway actress with only a few film roles. She was singled out by The New York Times critic Brooks Atkinson for her early work. She eventually attended the Actors Studio, studying under Elia Kazan, Lee Strasberg, and Vivian Nathan. She received the 1952 Theatre World Award for her performance as Anna Reeves in The Chase, and starred in such Broadway hits as Picnic (1953), playing Millie Owens and Bus Stop (1955), playing Cherie.

She was nominated for the 1959 Tony Award for Best Actress in a Play for A Touch of the Poet and the 1962 Tony for Best Actress in a Play for her portrayal of Elizabeth von Ritter in Henry Denker's A Far Country. Stanley also portrayed Maggie "The Cat" in Cat on a Hot Tin Roof in the original London production of the play at the Comedy Theatre, making her London and West End debut, alongside another newcomer, Paul Massie. Directed by Sir Peter Hall, this production ran for 132 performances, from January to May 1958. In 1965, she played Masha in the London run of an Actors Studio production of Anton Chekhov's play The Three Sisters. After a savaging of the production by local critics, she made good on her promise to never act on stage again.

She taught her unique approach to Method Acting in New York City. One of her students, John Uecker, continued to teach her technique in a studio setting that prepared actors for work of heightened realism, which was equally suited towards works of heightened circumstances as in those by Tennessee Williams and James Purdy, or kitchen-sink realism. The Kim Stanley Method featured a preparation technique with modified Misner repetition exercise, as well as Sense Memory and Affective Memory. It was relaxation-based, using needs individually or in combination to help integrate the actor into the context of the work. The needs, combined with a sense of place and relationships, made acting a sensual experience, not an intellectual exercise: the "actor" would not have to control their reactions, but allow themselves to be informed of the reality of the work. For stage work, this gave the actor a momentum of reality before even stepping on stage. For film, it might be simple enough to work on a small piece of music and allow that to inform the body, and therefore, the reactions.

=== Television ===
Stanley was a leading lady of live television drama, which flourished in New York City during the 1950s. On October 17, 1950, she starred in "The Vanishing Lady" on The Trap. Her other starring roles included Wilma, a star-struck 15-year-old girl from the U.S. Gulf Coast of Texas in Horton Foote's A Young Lady of Property, which aired on The Philco-Goodyear Television Playhouse on April 5, 1953.

=== Film ===
Her first film was The Goddess (1958), playing a tragic movie star. She starred in Séance on a Wet Afternoon (1964), winning both the National Board of Review Award for Best Actress and the New York Film Critics Circle Award for Best Actress, and was nominated for the Academy Award for Best Actress and the BAFTA Award for Best Actress in a Leading Role.

A filmed version of Strasberg-directed Three Sisters (1966) opened with Stanley reprising the role of Masha, and is the only time one can see her perform in a film alongside Geraldine Page, Sandy Dennis, Shelley Winters and other well-known names of the Actors Studio. She was nominated for an Academy Award for Best Supporting Actress and a Golden Globe Award for Best Supporting Actress – Motion Picture for her performance as Frances Farmer's possessive mother in Frances (1982). She also played Pancho Barnes in The Right Stuff (1983). Stanley was the uncredited narrator in the drama film To Kill a Mockingbird (1962). As the narrator, she represents the character Jean Louise Finch ("Scout") as an adult. Mary Badham portrays Scout as a child in the film.

She received an Emmy Award for Outstanding Single Performance by an Actress in a Leading Role for her appearance in the episode, "A Cardinal Act of Mercy" (1963), of the television series, Ben Casey (1961–1966), and an Emmy Award for Outstanding Supporting Actress in a Limited Series or a Special for her appearance in the 1984 television adaptation of Tennessee Williams's Southern melodrama Cat on a Hot Tin Roof, this time as Big Mama.

== Personal life ==
Stanley was married four times: to Bruce Hall (1945–1946), Curt Conway (1949–1956), Alfred Ryder (1958–1964), and Joseph Siegel (1964–1967). All four marriages ended in divorce.

She had three children: one by Curt Conway; one by Brooks Clift (brother of Montgomery Clift), while she was married to Conway; and one by Alfred Ryder (Laurie). During her marriage to Ryder, Stanley converted to Judaism.

Stanley did not act during her later years, preferring the role of teacher in New York City, Los Angeles, and later Santa Fe, New Mexico.

== Death ==
Stanley died of cancer at a hospital in Santa Fe at the age of 76. She was survived by her brother Justin, her children, and three grandchildren. A biography, Female Brando: the Legend of Kim Stanley (2006), by Jon Krampner, was published by Back Stage Books, a division of Watson-Guptill.

She was inducted into the New Mexico Entertainment Hall of Fame in 2012.

== Stage work ==
Partial listing of stage work:

Opening date	Closing date	Title	Role	Playwright	Theatre	Notes
1949	1949	Yes Is For A Very Young Man		Gertrude Stein	Cherry Lane Theatre	
Oct 29, 1949	Dec 24, 1949	Montserrat	Replacement for Julie Harris as Felisa	Lillian Hellman adaptation original Emmanuel Roblès	Fulton	
Jan 7, 1951	Jan 20, 1951	The House of Bernarda Alba	Adela	Federico García Lorca; Translation James Graham Lujan and Richard L. O'Connell	ANTA	
Apr 15, 1952	May 10, 1952	The Chase	Anna Reeves	Horton Foote	Playhouse	1952 Theatre World Award for Kim Stanley
Feb 19, 1953	Apr 10, 1954	Picnic	Millie Owens	William Inge	Music Box	New York Drama Critics Award
Oct 27, 1954	Nov 20, 1954	The Traveling Lady	Georgette Thomas	Horton Foote	Playhouse	
Mar 2, 1955	Apr 21, 1956	Bus Stop	Cherie	William Inge	Music Box; Winter Garden	
Jan 10, 1957	Feb 9, 1957	A Clearing in the Woods	Virginia	Arthur Laurents	Belasco	
Jan 30, 1958	May 25, 1958	Cat on a Hot Tin Roof	Maggie	Tennessee Williams	Comedy Theatre	
Oct 2, 1958	Jun 13, 1959	A Touch of the Poet	Sara Melody	Eugene O'Neill	Helen Hayes	Tony Award nomination, Best Actress
Oct 12, 1959	Nov 28, 1959	Chéri	Léa de Lonval	Anita Loos; Colette	Morosco	
Apr 4, 1961	Nov 25, 1961	A Far Country	Elizabeth von Ritter	Henry Denker	Music Box	Tony Award nomination, Best Actress
Jan 31, 1963	Mar 02, 1963	Natural Affection	Sue Barker	William Inge	Booth	
Jun 22, 1964	Oct 03, 1964	The Three Sisters	Masha	Anton Chekhov; Randall Jarrell English version	Morosco	

== Filmography ==
=== Film ===
Year	Title	Role	Notes
1958	The Goddess	Emily Ann Faulkner	
1962	To Kill a Mockingbird	Scout as an Adult – Narrator	Voice, Uncredited
1964	Séance on a Wet Afternoon	Myra Savage	Laurel Award for Top Dramatic Performance, Female (3rd place); National Board of Review Award for Best Actress; New York Film Critics Circle Award for Best Actress; Nominated-Academy Award for Best Actress; Nominated-BAFTA Award for Best Actress in a Leading Role
1966	The Three Sisters	Masha	
1982	Frances	Lillian Farmer	Nominated-Academy Award for Best Supporting Actress; Nominated-Golden Globe Award for Best Supporting Actress – Motion Picture
1983	The Right Stuff	Pancho Barnes	

=== Television ===
Year	Series	Role	Title and Notes
1950	The Magnavox Theatre	Unknown	Father, Dear Father
1950	Cavalcade of Stars	Self	Episode #1.53
1950	Sure As Fate	Unknown	The Vanishing Lady
1950	The Trap	Unknown	Sentence of Death
1950	Escape	Unknown	The Covenant
1951	Danger	Unknown	The Anniversary
1951	Out There	Unknown	The Bus to Nowhere
1952	Danger	Helen	The System
1952	Goodyear Television Playhouse	Unknown	The Witness
1953	You Are There	Cleopatra	The Death of Cleopatra (30 B.C.)
1953	You Are There	Joan of Arc	The Final Hours of Joan of Arc (May 30, 1431)
1953	The Gulf Playhouse	Unknown	The Tears of My Sister
1953	The Ed Sullivan Show	Self	Episode #6.36
1953	The Philco Television Playhouse	Unknown	A Young Lady of Property
1953	The Philco Television Playhouse	Unknown	The Strong Women
1953	The Philco Television Playhouse	Unknown	The Sixth Sense
1954	Danger	Unknown	The Bet
1954	Goodyear Television Playhouse	Unknown	The Brownstone
1954	The Philco Television Playhouse	Unknown	Somebody Special
1954	Armstrong Circle Theatre	Unknown	H Is for Hurricane
1954	Inner Sanctum Mystery	Maggie	The Hands
1954	Kraft Television Theatre	Unknown	The Scarlet Letter
1955	A.N.T.A. Album of 1955	Herself	Production of American National Theater and Academy
1955	Playwrights 56	Abby	The Waiting Place
1955	Playwrights 56	Martha Anderson	Flight
1955	The Elgin Hour	Lili	The Bridge
1956	Goodyear Television Playhouse	Kay	Joey
1956	Goodyear Television Playhouse	Unknown	In the Days of Our Youth
1956	Goodyear Television Playhouse	Unknown	Conspiracy of Hearts
1956	Kraft Television Theatre	Unknown	Death Is a Spanish Dancer
1957	Kraft Television Theatre	Unknown	The Glass Wall
1957	Westinghouse Studio One	Georgette Thomas	The Traveling Lady
1957	Playhouse 90	Mae D'Amato	Clash by Night
1958	Armchair Theatre	Georgette Thomas	The Travelling Lady
1960	Playhouse 90	Sarah Eubanks	Tomorrow
1960	Armchair Theatre	Unknown	The Cake Baker
1960	DuPont Show of the Month	Sarah Anne Howe	Ethan Frome
1962	Westinghouse Presents: That's Where the Town Is Going	Wilma Sills	TV movie
1963	Ben Casey	Faith Parsons	A Cardinal Act of Mercy:, Parts 1 and 2 Primetime Emmy Award Outstanding Single Performance by an Actress in a Leading Role
1964	The Eleventh Hour	Unknown	Does My Mother Have to Know?:, Parts 1 and 2
1968	Flesh and Blood	Della	TV movie
1969	U.M.C.	Joanna Hanson	TV movie, Pilot for Medical Center
1970	NET Playhouse: Dragon Country	Unknown	TV movie
1971	Night Gallery	Elizabeth Croft	A Fear of Spiders/Junior/Marmalade Wine/The Academy
1971	The Name of the Game	Veta Marie Goss	The Man Who Killed a Ghost
1982	It Takes Two	Mrs. Tandy	Death Penalty
1983	55th Academy Awards	Self	
1983	Quincy, M.E.	Mrs. Edith Jordan	Beyond the Open Door
1984	Cat on a Hot Tin Roof	Big Mama	TV movie Primetime Emmy Award Outstanding Supporting Actress in a Limited Series or a Special (final performance)
2005	The Needs of Kim Stanley	Self	Documentary

== See also ==
- List of American film actresses
- List of American television actresses
- List of people from New Mexico
