= Ruston Academy =

Coordinates: 23.07744°N 82.45928°W

- Academia Ruston
- Type: Private
- Active: 1920–1961
- Director: Hiram Hall Ruston; James Baker
- Students: 750
- Location: Havana, Cuba
- Language: English, Spanish
- Website: www.rustonacademy.net

The Ruston Academy was a bilingual American school founded in Havana, Cuba, in 1920.

== History ==
Rushton Academy opened in September 1920 in Havana by retired English teacher Hiram Hall Ruston and his sister Martha Ruston, of Princeton, Indiana.

Originally focused on providing an English college-preparatory education for the children of American expatriates in Cuba, it quickly grew into a bilingual academy with a multinational student body. In the 1940s, Ruston expanded to include an elementary school, business preparatory program, basic English classes for Cuban students, and a boarding school, with enrollment reaching at roughly 750 students. In 1955, Ruston moved to a new, larger campus in Havana.

Mr. Ruston served as headmaster from 1920 to his death in 1946, after which James Baker took over the school's administration. James and his wife Sibyl inherited ownership of the school and converted it into an educational non-profit foundation. Ruston Academy was closed down by the Castro government in 1961. Its former location was used as a public school, storage facility, homeless shelter, and military intelligence facility by the Cuban government.

The Ruston-Baker Educational Institution (RBEI) was founded in 1992 by James Baker and former members of the Ruston Academy Board of Directors, with the goal of reopening Ruston Academy following the collapse of the Castro government. The RBEI maintains a network of alumni located across the globe. Sibyl Baker died in 1993 and James Baker died in 2001.
