= The Goddess (1958 film) =

1958 drama film by John Cromwell

- Directed by: John Cromwell
- Written by: Paddy Chayefsky
- Produced by: Milton Perlman
- Starring: Kim Stanley; Lloyd Bridges; Steven Hill; Betty Lou Holland
- Cinematography: Arthur J. Ornitz
- Edited by: Carl Lerner
- Music by: Virgil Thomson
- Color process: Black and white
- Production company: Carnegie Productions
- Distributed by: Columbia Pictures
- Release date: April 17, 1958
- Running time: 105 minutes
- Country: United States
- Language: English
- Budget: $550,000 (est.)

The Goddess is a 1958 American drama film directed by John Cromwell and starring Kim Stanley and Lloyd Bridges. From a screenplay by Paddy Chayefsky, the film is an in-depth character study of the life of a troubled and lonely girl who becomes a movie star adored by millions, but is miserable in her private life. The movie was nominated for an Academy Award for Best Original Screenplay.

== Plot ==
Emily Ann Faulkner is born into poverty in the South, has no father, no friends, and is unloved by her indifferent mother, Laureen, who does not want to be tied down by a child. As a teenager, Emily is socially ostracized by the local townspeople, except for the boys who are attracted to her good looks and sexual availability. Emily lets them have sex with her to have some brief respite from her loneliness; the rest of the time, she retreats into Hollywood fantasies. During WWII, she meets and marries world-weary G.I. John Tower, who also suffers from his dysfunctional upbringing as the son of a well-known movie actor. Unable to cope with a rocky marriage and unwanted pregnancy, Emily soon escapes to Hollywood, leaving her baby daughter in John's care.

In Hollywood, Emily soon marries Dutch Seymour, a former champion boxer turned Hollywood socialite. She initially enjoys the attention and social status she gets as Dutch's wife, but rejects his idea that they move to St. Louis so he can join his family's business. Anxious to further her career, Emily poses for risque magazine photos and has casting couch affairs, ending her marriage to Dutch. Emily is soon transformed into the glamorous superstar sex goddess, Rita Shawn. Despite her celebrity and wealth, she is still insecure and fears being alone, seeking comfort in drinking and promiscuity.

Rita finally has a nervous breakdown requiring hospitalization, which causes her elderly mother Laureen to finally come to Hollywood for a visit. Rita is thrilled to see her mother and clings to her, trying to impress her. However, Laureen has turned from her past immorality to religious fervor, is unimpressed by Rita's money and success, and mainly seeks to convert her daughter. Rita has very few friends, and the visiting couple she introduces to her mother as her "dearest and oldest friends" privately tell Laureen that they barely know Rita and only met her a short time ago, adding that Rita should see a psychiatrist.

Rita wants her mother to stay with her permanently, but Laureen insists on returning home to her simple life of attending church, caring for her sick brother, and helping her sister-in-law run the family store. As her mother is leaving, Rita becomes enraged and screams from the doorway that she hates her and wishes her dead. When her mother later dies, Rita has a drunken public breakdown at her grave. The self-destructive Rita now lives under the constant supervision of a stern secretary/nurse, Harding, who has become Rita's mother figure. John Tower tries to reconcile with Rita/Emily for the sake of their young daughter, whom John has learned to love, thus breaking the cycle of family dysfunction. But Rita is too psychologically damaged.

== Cast ==
- Kim Stanley as Emily Ann Faulkner/Rita Shawn
- Lloyd Bridges as Dutch Seymour
- Steven Hill as John Tower
- Betty Lou Holland as Mrs. Laureen Faulkner
- Burt Brinckerhoff as The Boy
- Bert Freed as Lester Brackman
- Gerald Hiken as George
- Elizabeth Wilson as Harding
- Joan Copeland as Alice Marie
- Joyce Van Patten as Hillary
- Joanne Linville as Joanna
- Donald Mckee as R.M. Lucas
- John Lawrence as Soldier
- Curt Conway as The Writer
- Fred Herrick as The Elder
- Patty Duke as Emily Ann Faulkner, age 8
- Linda Soma as Bridesmaid
- Kris Flanagan as Himself
- Gerald Petrarca as The Minister
- Roy Shuman as Soldier
- Gail Haworth as Emily's Daughter
- Louise Beavers as The cook
- Werner Klemperer as Joe Woolsy
- Margaret Brayton as Sally Woolsy

== Production ==
The story is said to be based loosely on Marilyn Monroe. According to an article published by Turner Classic Movies, "Some critics have conjectured that The Goddess was based on the career of Ava Gardner, but most think its primary model was Marilyn Monroe, who studied at the Actors Studio at the same time Stanley did."

The Goddess was filmed, in part, in Ellicott City, Maryland, which serves as the childhood home of Emily Ann and provides the backdrop for the opening and closing scenes. The interior scenes were filmed at the Gold Medal Studios, the Bronx, New York; in addition to Maryland, location filming was also done in Hollywood, at the Beverly Hills Hotel in Beverly Hills and at the Fox Village Theater, Westwood, California. Frank Thompson designed the costumes for the film.

== Reception ==
In his June 25, 1958 review, Bosley Crowther of The New York Times calls The Goddess "a shattering, but truly potent, film, in which a lot of characters are groping for the fulfillment they cannot seem to find". Crowther adds that scriptwriter Chayefsky "has studied his subject thoughtfully, for the meshing of human contacts and emotional relations is clear and sound. Furthermore, he has conveyed them in finely written scenes and dialogue."

The Philadelphia Inquirer was highly complimentary: “Whether ‘The Goddess’ wins prizes or not is less important than the fact it represents something extraordinary even in a day when sensitivity and integrity are to be expected in our better screen actresses....’The Goddess’ is by no means a behind-the-scenes Hollywood drama. It is very much more. Divided into three acts, or sections, called ‘Portrait of a Girl,’ ‘Portrait of a Young Woman,’ and ‘Portrait of a Goddess,” Chayevsky’s unflinching study has the inevitability of a Greek tragedy presented in the modern idiom....Just as ‘Marty’ towered over any of Chayevsky’s other television dramas subsequently turned into films, so ‘The Goddess’ surpasses ‘Marty’ in awareness and depth. Scene after scene, line after line grip the mind and heart, to move or to horrify. Nowhere has the author, his cast or director John Cromwell struck a false or artificial note.”

In the book The Immortal Marilyn (2006), scholars De John Vito and Frank Tropea praise Chayefsky's writing as "masterful", and write that Stanley "pulled out all the stops, perfectly hitting every single note of Chayefsky's complex, lyrical arias". Conversely, in an article for TCM, authors Mikita Brottman and David Sterritt criticize the work as having "a stilted pace, underwritten minor characters, and a mood that's much too solemn".

Rotten Tomatoes gives the film a 57 percent rating based on seven contemporary and modern reviews.

== Adaptation ==
In 2013, director John Mossman adapted the screenplay for a stage production at Chicago's The Artistic Home, receiving a Jeff Award for New Adaptation and marking the first screen-to-stage adaptation of a Chayefsky screenplay.
