= George Morrison (acting teacher) =

American actor and director

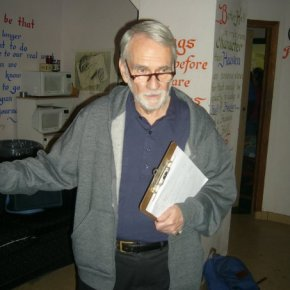

George Morrison (February 14, 1928 – June 28, 2014) was one of the leading teachers of acting in the United States.

== Early life, education and military service ==
Morrison was born in Evanston, Illinois. He attended the public schools there and started acting in the pioneering children’s theater headed by Winifred Ward. By age 13 he was playing Tom Sawyer in an elaborate production with the adult roles being played by Northwestern University students. On graduation from high school he spent three summers in a Pennsylvania on-week stock company directed by Alvina Krause, where he played parts ranging from Ernest in The Importance of Being Earnest to Shylock in The Merchant of Venice. He served two years in the United States Army, and graduated with a Ph.B. from the University of Chicago. It was here that he began a lifelong friendship with Mike Nichols and Paul Sills. He also attended the Yale Drama School as a director and came to New York City in 1953 where he studied in Lee Strasberg's private class and then for a number of years at the Actors Studio.

== Teaching ==
Morrison created the George Morrison Studio, where he offered acting classes for over 20 years; his students included Gene Hackman and Barbara Harris. (Hackman would later thank Morrison during his acceptance speech for the Best Actor award for his role in The French Connection at the 1972 Academy Awards.) In 1972, Morrison became one of the founding faculty of a new Actor Training Program along with Norris Houghton and Joseph Anthony at the State University of New York at Purchase, where he taught for 18 years and was awarded the Chancellor’s Citation for Outstanding Teaching and is now Professor Emeritus of Theater Arts. His students at Purchase included Edie Falco, Ving Rhames and Stanley Tucci. He retired in 1988 to found, with Paul Sills and Mike Nichols, his classmates from the University of Chicago, a two-year independent conservatory for professional actor training, The New Actors Workshop, in New York City where he served as the president and primary instructor of acting.

== Directing ==
Morrison's first New York production was Epitaph for George Dillon by John Osborne and Anthony Creighton, which he co-produced and directed. He went on to direct improvisation-based revues off Broadway at The Premise with a company that included Hackman, George Furth, Cynthia Harris and Ron Leibman, and at Upstairs at the Downstairs - a cabaret revue that included Mary Louise Wilson and Jane Alexander. For The American Place Theater, he directed Harry, Noon and Night by Ronald Ribman, with Dustin Hoffman and Joel Grey and in Chicago a long-running production of Pinter’s The Caretaker. On Broadway, he directed Jack Klugman in The Sudden & Accidental Re-Education of Horse Johnson by Douglas Taylor, and for ABC-TV two musical revue scripts by Betty Comden and Adolph Green.
