= James Purdy =

American writer (1914–2009)

James Otis Purdy
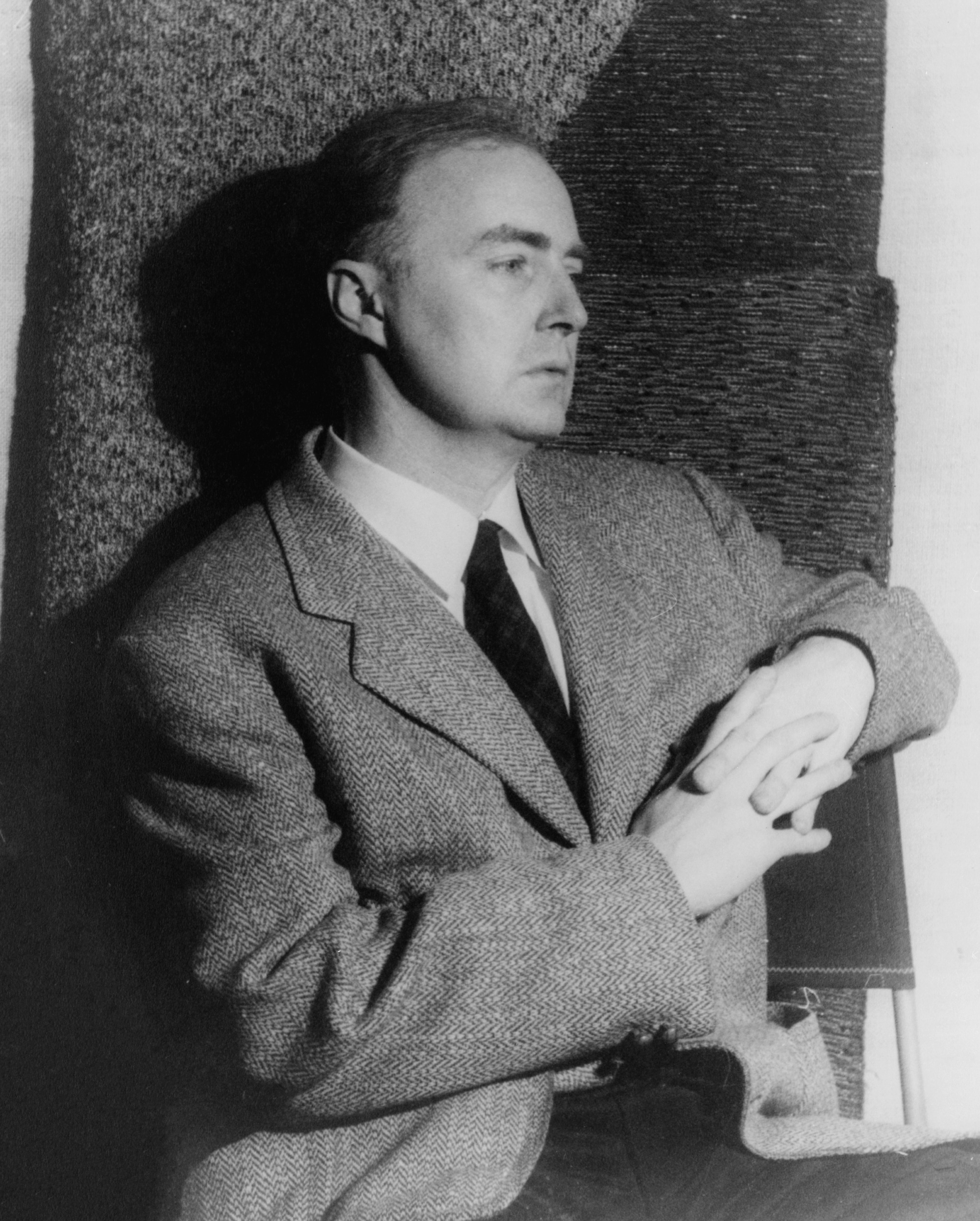
- Photo by Carl Van Vechten, 1957
- Born: James Otis Purdy; July 17, 1914; Hicksville, Ohio, U.S.
- Died: March 13, 2009 (aged 94); Englewood, New Jersey, U.S.
- Occupations: Novelist; poet; playwright
- Writing career
- Genres: Drama, poetry, fictional prose

James Otis Purdy (July 17, 1914 – March 13, 2009) was an American novelist, short-story writer, poet, and playwright who, from his debut in 1956, published over a dozen novels, and many collections of poetry, short stories, and plays. His work has been translated into more than 30 languages and in 2013 his short stories were collected in The Complete Short Stories of James Purdy.

He has been praised by writers such as Edward Albee, James M. Cain, Lillian Hellman, Francis King, Marianne Moore, Dorothy Parker, Dame Edith Sitwell, Terry Southern, Gore Vidal (who described Purdy as "an authentic American genius"), Jonathan Franzen (who called him, in Farther Away, "one of the most undervalued and underread writers in America"), A.N. Wilson, and both Jane Bowles and Paul Bowles.

Purdy was the recipient of the Morton Dauwen Zabel Fiction Award from the American Academy of Arts and Letters (1993) and was nominated for the 1985 PEN/Faulkner Award for his novel On Glory's Course (1984). In addition, he won two Guggenheim Fellowships (1958 and 1962), and grants from the Ford Foundation (1961), and Rockefeller Foundation.

He worked as an interpreter, and lectured in Europe with the United States Information Agency.

== Early life, education and early career ==
Purdy was born in Hicksville, Ohio, in 1914. His family moved to Findlay, Ohio, when he was about five years old, where he graduated from Findlay High School in 1932. Purdy's parents went through a separation and then a bitter divorce in 1930 after his father lost large sums of money in investments gone bad. His mother then converted their home in Findlay to a boarding house of which she was proprietress.

Purdy earned a Bachelor of Arts teaching degree in French from Bowling Green State College in 1935, and taught French at the Greenbrier Military School in West Virginia. Then he studied at the University of Chicago, where he earned a master's degree in English in 1937. He joined the United States Army in May 1941.

Purdy wrote his Master’s Thesis on British novelist Ronald Firbank—“Ronald Firbank: The End of the Decadent Tradition” (dated December 1936)—and later many critics noted Firbank’s influence on Purdy’s novels.

After serving in the Army, he studied Spanish at the University of Chicago (1944–45). He spent the summer of 1945 at the University of Puebla, Mexico, and taught English at the Ruston Academy in Havana, Cuba, in 1945–1946. For the next nine and a half years, he taught Spanish at Lawrence College, in Appleton, Wisconsin. In the mid-1950s, with encouragement and support from Miriam and Osborn Andreas and the Andreas Foundation (Archer Daniels Midland), Purdy returned to Chicago to pursue writing.

=== Artistic scenes and influences ===
In 1935, soon after his arrival in Chicago to attend the University of Chicago, Purdy, broke and without friends, met the painter Gertrude Abercrombie. She was nicknamed the "Queen of the Bohemian Artists". His vast body of work includes many works inspired by his close relationship with Abercrombie and her underground salon (which had its roots in the salon of Gertrude Stein). During the 1930s, Purdy was one of Abercrombie's closest friends. This American incarnation of the creative parlour had at the center those who were to become the jazz greats: Percy Heath, Sonny Rollins, Erroll Garner, Dizzie Gillespie, Charlie Parker, Max Roach, Miles Davis and Sarah Vaughan. Purdy attended the all-night, weekend gatherings where bebop and jazz were improvised by these greats (many times with Abercrombie at the piano). The concerts impressed him deeply. "Through these jazz singers and musicians, who would often stay with Abercrombie, young Purdy received an intensive education in African American music and culture." Indeed, the high incidence of black figures in Purdy's work went unnoticed by critics and reviewers because they were so thoroughly integrated. Equally important was his intensive study as a young boy of the Old Testament in the King James Version of the Bible as well as the Complete Works of William Shakespeare. All were key in making Purdy the writer he became. For quite some time during his Chicago years, Purdy lived in Abercrombie's "ruined" mansion, with members of the Modern Jazz Quartet.

The music and lives these jazz musicians were able to create from their own humble origins inspired Purdy to realize that he could create a uniquely individual voice in literature, using his American small-town speech patterns and his worlds of poverty and neglect. Abercrombie and those in her "circle" had done the same with painting. They had "taken the essence of our music and transported it to another form", according to her friend and fellow artist Dizzie Gillespie. Purdy's associations with these jazz artists and especially his meeting with Billie Holiday gave him the insight as well as the confidence to move from an upstart and lost boy, prone to running wild, to a world-class writer and artist. His relationship to the painters in Abercrombie's circle of magic realists Ivan Albright, Dudley Huppler, Karl Priebe, Julia Thecla, and John Wilde helped develop the strokes of imagery he would use to create his own version of an American "magic realism" in literature.

== Writing ==
The influence of Chicago's jazz scene and the experience of the "New Negro Renaissance" is reflected in all his early work.

It begins with the short story "Eventide" printed first in the private collection Don't Call Me by My Right Name and then commercially in the collection Color of Darkness (Teeboy who would never be coming home again, played the tenor saxophone at The Music Box and had his hair made straight), to the novella 63 Dream Palace (63rd Street is home to the Chicago jazz scene), then to Children is All, Cabot Wright Begins, and Eustace Chisholm and the Works.

Even his small-town Ohio novel The Nephew echoes the story of the boy who would never be coming home again. "Eventide" was the pivotal story which led to his becoming a published writer. His final novel Gertrude of Stony Island Avenue harks back to a remembrance of painter Abercrombie and others in her circle of artists.

Narrow Rooms (1977) is, at an initial level, a personal communication looking back some 25 years to Wendell Wilcox, a failed writer in the Abercrombie circle. Wilcox, who had once enjoyed a degree of success, stopped publishing at the very moment Purdy began commercial publication.

Always of major significance was jazz both in Chicago and New York City. Shortly after his move to New York City, Carl Van Vechten and the Harlem Renaissance circle became a lens for his work. The comic novels I am Elijah Thrush, Out with the Stars and Garments the Living Wear are the New York incarnations of this reflection.

Abercrombie also introduced the young student to others in her circle, to Miriam Bomberger Andreas and to the industrialist and literary essayist, Osborn Andreas, both of whom would become extremely significant in Purdy's life and work. His first book, Don't Call Me by My Right Name and Other Stories, was privately published by Osborn with the Andreas Foundation. The title story is based on Andreas' wife, Miriam. His first five books, with the exception of The Nephew, were inspired by his association with Miriam and Osborn Andreas. His first novel, which set forth his own developing style of American magic realism, was praised lavishly by Dorothy Parker and others of great literary merit. It was for decades a staple of the undergraduate American Literature curriculum of many American colleges and universities.

If Abercrombie and the Andreases inspired Purdy to become a writer, then Dame Edith Sitwell made him a known one. When she received the privately printed edition, which Purdy had on a hunch sent to her, of Don't Call Me by My Right Name and Other Stories, she was convinced she had discovered a great black writer from the story "Eventide", which she felt only a black man could write. After she had asked Purdy to supply more instances of his work, Purdy sent her his newly published private edition of 63: Dream Palace. Both books were designed by Purdy with his own unique drawings. Upon the additional basis of this new work, Sitwell had become convinced that he was "a writer of genius" (her words); and she obtained a serious commercial publisher for his work in England. She would later write the prefaces for the publication of both these works. Her reviews, pronouncements, and assessments of his further works helped him create a coterie of supporters (notably Parker and Angus Wilson) both in England and the U.S. Purdy felt he would never have been a known writer without her: "My stories were always returned with angry, peevish, indignant rejections from the New York slick magazines and they earned if possible even more hostile comments from the little magazines. All editors were insistent that I would never be a published writer."

=== Obstacles to wider acceptance ===
Through all his work, Purdy dealt primarily with outsiders: women, blacks, Native Americans (his maternal grandmother was 1/8 Ojibway), homosexuals (living far outside the conventional gay community) – anyone who could be seen to be outside the circle of "normal" acceptability. His final short story, Adeline, written at age 92, is a tale of transgender acceptance. Much of his early work takes place in extreme poverty, and is located in a small-town, heightened American vernacular. In the beginning of her assessment of him, Sitwell felt he was always writing the black experience without necessarily mentioning race. Purdy's association with the American black experience is paramount to understanding him as an artist. In addition to his beginnings with Abercrombie, Van Vechten took him up when he arrived in New York City and introduced him to his own important New York City circle of black artists, boxers and activists. Langston Hughes praised Purdy as "the last of the [n-word] writers" for his use of the vernacular. He was seen as a master of different kinds of American vernacular as well.

In addition to his knowledge of modern European languages, Purdy knew Latin and ancient Greek, and maintained an extensive classical library. His novel In a Shallow Grave has overt classical references running throughout, as do many others. His final novel Gertrude of Stony Island Avenue echoes the story of Demeter descending into Hades in search of her daughter Persephone. The novels that beleaguered his reputation, such as Eustace Chisholm & the Works and Narrow Rooms, merely restate in a modern context the psychology of Dionysus set forth in The Bacchae by Euripides. The outer texture of his work is realistic while the deeper and more elusive interior reveals a mythic, almost archetypal trail. Its great age is apparent; its history is clearly rooted in the classics and in the Old Testament. Thus his work can be very American but it can be appreciated by a western reader familiar with these literatures.

In his compressed dialogue structure, Purdy was ahead of his time. Much-later writers like David Mamet, Harold Pinter, and Samuel Beckett (also an admirer) paved the way to the acceptance of works in this "distilled" style which has now become the sine qua non of the modern audience with its very different attention span. His early stories from the 1940s and 1930s were, because of their brevity, not even considered short stories at all at the time. Now this brevity of conveying a fullness and richness of experience in what Sitwell called a "marrow of form" has almost become a necessary standard. Both his "distilled" style and his reliance on dialogue to tell his story eluded the normal contemporary reader of his early days. There was an ingrained custom towards a much longer, more expository experience. His roots were in drama. Purdy started writing plays as a child, crafting them to win his elder brother's approval. Purdy would act all the characters in the plays, and play them out using stick-figures, which is consistent with the early origins of Federico García Lorca.

Purdy became known as a "homosexual writer" after the publication of Eustace Chisholm and the Works. Gore Vidal indicates that one obstacle to his more widespread recognition was the impossibility of reconciling his work that was labeled and published as "gay" to some of his other works and especially to the Faulkneresque novels based on his ancestors. Even today, as Vidal asserts, it is a problem that needs a solution. Sitwell had recognized this when she stated that Purdy "has enormous variety".

=== Cutting edge ===
From the start, his work had often been at the edge of what was printable under American censorship. The major US publishing houses rejected his two early books 63: Dream Palace (1956), and Colour of Darkness (1961), which had to be printed privately abroad. The publishers, according to Purdy, believed that he was insane. In 1972, the supposedly liberal New York literary establishment was outraged by his I am Elijah Thrush. Although his work was appreciated in Europe, Purdy encountered censorship there too. Victor Gollancz could not bring himself to print the word "motherfucker" in the 1957 UK edition of 63: Dream Palace. As late as May 1990, the German government tried to ban Narrow Rooms, but received the ruling that it was a "work of the literary imagination which had no business in the courts". Although many readers were scandalized, a solid cadre of distinguished critics and scholars embraced his work from the start, including John Cowper Powys, Dame Edith, Dorothy Parker, and Susan Sontag, who warmly defended him against puritanical critics. Tennessee Williams was also an early admirer of Purdy's work.

=== Cabot Wright Begins and Eustace Chisholm & the Works ===
In January 1966, an incendiary manifesto by Stanley Kauffmann set forth a bluntly damning and prejudicial way of criticizing works by homosexual writers. The article stirred the arts community. This finger in the wind of the so-called liberal critical establishment actually reflected the deep nature of an institutionalized prejudice throughout the media. Soon afterwards, Purdy set out to write a novel of what he experienced in Abercrombie's Chicago scene of the 1930s. This time it was to reflect his fitfully terminated friendship with Wendell Wilcox, a writer of minor achievement in their circle. It would also include a scathing portrait of the department store heir Norman Macleish of the noted Chicago family.

All of Purdy's work after Eustace Chisholm would subsequently be met with both great praise on the one side, and stern, vehement condemnation and misunderstanding on the other. In 1967, a year after the publication of the treatise to limit homosexual artists, his Eustace Chisholm and the Works – his "undisguised" bisexual work – was put forth. The novel is dedicated to Albee. Several high-profile critics were extremely hostile to the book, with its violent and explicitly homoerotic content. Purdy recalled in 1993 that he was "burned at the stake" in the New York Times review of Eustace Chisholm.

Critically it was thrown to an interpretation of and by this new Kauffmann assessment (quoted as the source in the review) and was vehemently condemned on all grounds including moral ones. The "noble" hatchet type review followed exactly the policy which had been set forth two years earlier. The attack surrounding the book chilled Purdy's growing popularity though the book sold more copies than any of his other works.

Combined with this critical reception (and its effect on Purdy) of both Cabot Wright Begins and Eustace Chisholm & the Works was the fact that, by the time of publication of these novels, all his immediate family, his friends and his supporters had died. This included Sitwell, Van Vechten, Parker, Powys, and Purdy's brother who had been a noteworthy actor in New York City and very important to his development in literature. This eliminated all the defenders of both him as a writer and the two novels themselves. Osborn Andreas, his patron, had also died. All these deaths occurred within a two-year period between 1965 and 1967, devastating Purdy's basis of support financially, critically and personally. "I soon realized that if my life up to then had been a series of pitched battles, it was to be in the future a kind of endless open warfare", Purdy wrote in an autobiographical sketch in 1984.

=== Later works ===
At a loss to know how to proceed, Purdy began looking at pictures of his long-dead relatives for solace and validation. He began to remember the stories his grandmother and great-grandmother told him when he was a child, about eminent people, mostly women, and most often on the outside of a hidebound code of acceptance in the long-ago towns of the hill country of Ohio.

In 1968, he began a series of independent but interconnected books (and plays) about the characters who populated these tales from his childhood, Sleepers in Moon Crowned Valleys. In his hands, they were to become the voices and journeys of an almost mythic people of a uniquely different and undiscovered America. He would follow them in their navigation through life and circumstance. The narratives were something that could be found perhaps in the archives of a historical society in the towns set into the farm country and rolling hills of the Midwest. Through these memories there began to flow also the remembrance of the country vernacular and way of speaking of his great-grandparents. He began to create, in association with these individuals and their stories, a voice that Paul Bowles would call "the closest thing we have to a classical American colloquial".

Regarding Sleepers in Moon Crowned Valleys, Gore Vidal stated in his New York Times essay, "Each novel stands entire by itself while the whole awaits archeology and constitution of a work that is already like no other."

As part of the series in 1974 he published The House of the Solitary Maggot, which is often regarded as his most ambitious work. It was largely ignored. In 1978, he published Narrow Rooms (a set of violent and obsessive homosexual relationships, based in West Virginia). This was nearly developed into a film directed by Derek Jarman in 1992 for Channel Four, but Purdy objected to the casting of Kevin Collins. Jarman refused any other actor, so the film stalled.

=== Breakthrough in evaluation ===
The 1997 publication of Purdy's final novel, Gertrude of Stony Island Avenue, reflected a reappraisal of his work. A New York Times review assessed him as a "singular American visionary". On the last reprints of several of his books, a further essay by Gore Vidal in The New York Times, entitled "The Novelist As Outlaw," framed him as "an authentic American genius".

In 2005, the novel that had held Purdy's reputation at bay for decades, Eustace Chisholm and the Works, received the Clifton Fadiman Award at the Mercantile Library. Given to overlooked novels, the prize was presented to Purdy by Jonathan Franzen, who declared in his speech, "Mr. Purdy’s novel is so good that almost any novel you read immediately after it will seem at least a little bit posturing, or dishonest, or self-admiring, in comparison."

Following several reissues of previously out-of-print novels, as well as Vidal's appreciation in The New York Times Book Review, Purdy's work again enjoyed a brief small renaissance in the first decade of the 2000s, including among younger writers. As Albee wrote, "there is a Purdy renaissance every ten years, like clockwork".

Shortly after his death in 2009, a book of plays, Selected Plays of James Purdy, including Brice, Ruthanna Elder, Where Quentin Goes and The Paradise Circus, was published by Ivan R. Dee. It focuses on Purdy's playwriting as being his first form of writing since childhood, when he wrote plays for his brother to perform. John Waters contributed the following blurb on the cover: "James Purdy's Selected Plays will break your damaged little heart."

Further evidence of the twenty-first-century revival of Purdy's reputation is Oxford University Press's publication of his biography by Michael Snyder. Snyder says that "Purdy got under the skin of America to something deep, universal and macabre."

=== Later life ===
For nearly 50 years he lived and wrote in a small apartment in a Brooklyn Heights landmarked building surrounded by dozens of framed boxing prints from the turn of the 20th century, bare-knuckled champs in the makeshift outside rings of their day. To the end of his life, he continued to dictate to a small team of devoted friends, and ascribed his continued intellectual vigor to the drinking of green tea and the avoidance of alcohol and tobacco. His advice to young writers was to "banish shame".

Purdy died aged 94, in a nursing home in Englewood, New Jersey, on March 13, 2009. In accordance with his wishes, he was cremated and his ashes transported by Maria Cecilia Holt and Charles Lock to Northamptonshire, England, to be buried next to his benefactor Sitwell.

=== Legacy ===
Purdy wrote anonymous letters from the age of nine: his first was written to his mother's landlady, whom Purdy disliked. Subsequently, he wrote countless thousands, many now owned by persons who have no idea of their provenance or value, although the style is inimitable. They feature some of Purdy's drawings, which have attracted some attention.

The American composer Robert Helps, a close friend of Purdy's, used Purdy's texts in two of his works, The Running Sun and Gossamer Noons, both of which have been recorded by the soprano Bethany Beardslee.

The American song composer Richard Hundley composed many songs to poems of Purdy, his friend as well of several decades in New York City. Some of his works set to Purdy's poetry, like "Come Ready and See Me", have been praised as true classics in the medium of the American song.

In an autobiographical sketch in 1984, Purdy stated, "My work has been compared to an underground river which is flowing often undetected through the American landscape".

He received the Bill Whitehead Award for Lifetime Achievement from Publishing Triangle in 1991.

== Bibliography ==
- Don't Call Me by My Right Name and Other Stories (nine short stories) (1956)
- 63: Dream Palace (novella) (1956)
- 63: Dream Palace: A Novella and Nine Stories (UK, 1957)
- Color of Darkness: Eleven Stories and a Novella) (USA, 1957)
- Malcolm (1959)
- The Nephew (1960)
- Colour of Darkness (short stories) (UK, 1961)
- Children Is All (1963)
- Cabot Wright Begins (1965)
- Eustace Chisholm and the Works (1967)
- Jeremy's Version (1970)
- I Am Elijah Thrush (1972)
- Color of Darkness & Malcolm (1974)
- The House of the Solitary Maggot (1974)
- In a Shallow Grave (1976)
- A Day After the Fair: A Collection of Plays and Short Stories (1977)
- Narrow Rooms (1978)
- Lessons and Complaints (poems) (1978)
- Dream Palaces: Three Novels (omnibus) (1980)
- Proud Flesh: Four Short Plays (1980)
- Mourners Below (1981)
- Scrap of Paper & The Beiry-Picker: Two Plays by James Purdy (1981), published by Sylvester & Orphanos
- On Glory's Course (1984)
- The Brooklyn Branding Parlors (poems) (1986)
- In the Hollow of His Hand (1986)
- The Candles of Your Eyes (1988)
- Garments the Living Wear (1989)
- Collected Poems (1990)
- Dream Palace: Selected Stories, 1956–87 (1991)
- Out with the Stars (1992)
- In the Night of Time and Four Other Plays (1992)
- Reaching Rose (1994)
- Epistles of Care (1995)
- Gertrude of Stony Island Avenue (1996)
- Moe's Villa and Other Stories (short stories) (2000, 2005)
- James Purdy: Selected Plays (2009)
- The Complete Short Stories of James Purdy (2013)
- LETTERS
  - "The Correspondence of James Purdy and John Cowper Powys 1956–1963", edited with an introduction by Michael Ballin and Charles Lock. Powys Journal, Vol. XXIII (August 2013).

== Cited sources ==
- Snyder, Michael E. (2009) Mixedblood Metaphors: Allegories of Native America in the Fiction of James Purdy, Doctoral Thesis. University of Oklahoma
