= Till the Day I Die =

Play by Clifford Odets

- Original language: English
- Written by: Clifford Odets
- Genre: Drama
- Setting: an underground room, office in the Columbia Brown house, Barracks room, Brown house

Premiere
- Date: 1935

Till the Day I Die is a play by Clifford Odets performed on Broadway in 1935.

== Description ==
The play is a seven-scene drama written by Clifford Odets. It was originally written as a piece to accompany Waiting for Lefty.

== Productions ==
It was produced by the Group Theatre and staged by Cheryl Crawford, and ran for 136 performances from March 26, 1935, to July 1935 at the Longacre Theatre.

When the New Theatre in Sydney tried to stage it in 1936 following its production of Waiting for Lefty earlier that year, the German Consul General in Australia complained to the Commonwealth Government, and the play was banned. The theatre defied the ban and staged the play in private premises, and (after a similar controversy), it was staged to large audiences in Melbourne's New Theatre. It premiered in Britain at London's Unity Theatre in December 1941, with John Slater in the lead role and Randall Swingler delivering an epilogue.

In 2026, in Melbourne, Australia, theatre makers, Mark Wilson and Katie Sfetkidis staged a production on the back of a truck as part of Melbourne Fringe Festival, with a cast of 30 performers.

== Terminology ==
The play contains the first documented use of the phrase "male chauvinism".

== Broadway cast ==
- Margaret Barker as Tillie
- Abner Biberman as fourth Orderly
- Roman Bohnen as Major Duhring
- Lee J. Cobb as Detective Popper
- William Challee as Edsel Peltz
- Russell Collins as Schlupp
- Walter Coy as Karl Taussig
- George Heller as Secretary
- Elia Kazan as Baum and as other prisoner
- Alexander Kirkland as Ernst Taussig
- David Kortchmar as Zeltner and as second detective
- Gerrit Kraber as third orderly and as first detective
- Lewis Leverett as Captain Schlegel
- Bob Lewis as Martin and as an orderly
- Lee Martin as Stieglitz
- Paula Miller as woman
- Paul Morrison as other prisoner
- Ruth Nelson as woman
- Dorothy Patten as Frau Duhring
- Wendell K. Phillips as boy
- Herbert Ratner as Adolph
- Samuel Roland as first orderly and as Arno
- Eunice Stoddard as Zelda
- Harry Stone as another orderly and as second orderly
- Bernard Zanville as Julius
