= Gold Eagle Guy =

Broadway drama by Melvin Levy

- First edition 1935
- Written by: Melvin Levy
- Original language: English
- Genre: Drama
- Setting: San Francisco, California

Premiere
- Date premiered: November 28, 1934
- Place premiered: Morosco Theatre; New York City, New York

Gold Eagle Guy is a 1934 Broadway five scene drama written by Melvin Levy, produced by the Group Theatre with D. A. Doran, Jr., staged by Lee Strasberg, choreography by Helen Tamiris with scenic design by Donald Oenslager and costume design by Kay Morrison. It ran for 65 performances from November 28, 1934, to January 1935 at the Morosco Theatre.

== Cast ==
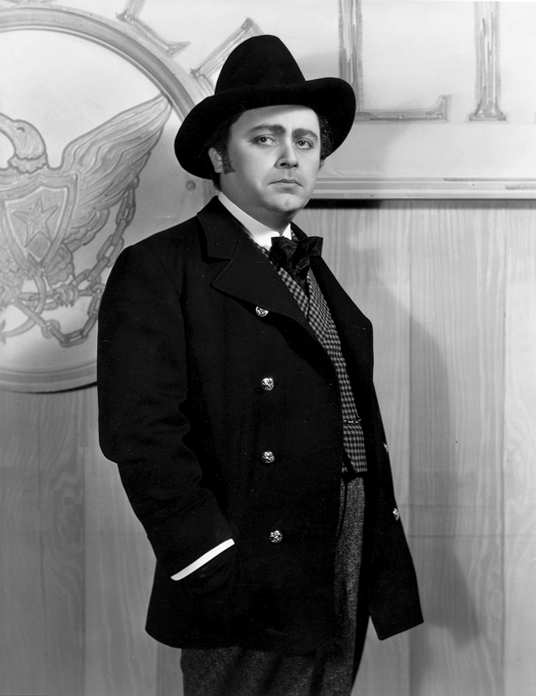
J. Edward Bromberg in Gold Eagle Guy

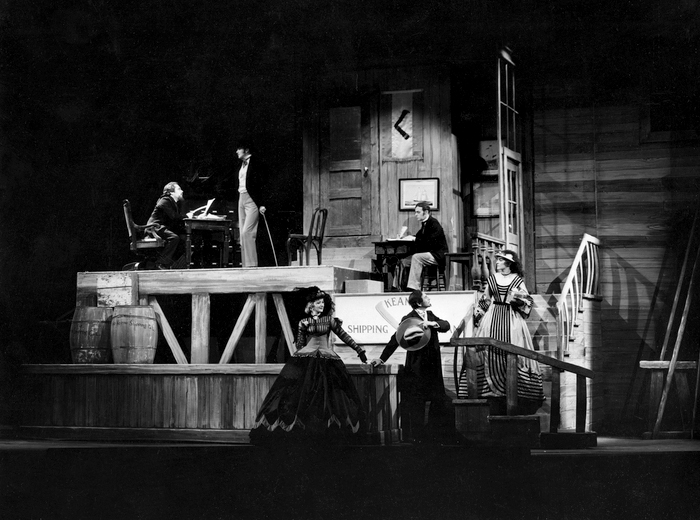
Donald Oenslager's two-story San Francisco shipping office setting for Gold Eagle Guy

- Luther Adler as Emperor Norton and as Tang Sin
- Stella Adler as Adah Menken
- Alan Baxter as MacNaurty and as Kohler and as postman
- Roman Bohnen as Macondray
- J. Edward Bromberg as Guy Button
- Morris Carnovsky as Will Parrott
- William Challee as Pearly and as Ah Kee
- Russell Collins as a deserter and as Ed Walker
- Walter Coy as Adam Keane
- Jules Garfield as sailor and as Mackay
- Elia Kazan as Polyziodes
- Alexander Kirkland as Lon Firth
- Lewis Leverett as a miner and as Captain Roberts and as André
- Bob Lewis as Gus and as Okajima
- Sanford Meisner as Ortega and as Guy, Jr. (in Act 3)
- Clifford Odets as Burns and as Jolais
- Art Smith as Merg and as Wallin
- Margaret Barker as Jessie Sargent
- Jackie Jordan as Guy, Jr. (in Act 2)
- David Kortchmar as another miner and as Rev. Brown
- Gerrit Kraber as Tony Sorrenson and as Joe
- Herbert Ratner as bartender and as Jacobs and as A.D.T. boy
- Marietta Bitter as harpist Miss Grackle
- Jack Kaiser as Accordion Ed

Girls of the "Mantic" barroom

- Ruth Nelson and as Mrs. McElvay and as Miss Richards
- Phoebe Brand and as Elizabeth Jolais
- Joan Madison and as Mrs. Muller
- Paula Miller and as Mrs. Sheldon and as Mrs. Nass
- Florence Cooper and as Mrs. DaSilva
- Evelyn Geller
- Helen Carrm and as Mrs. Halstead
- Eunice Stoddard and as Mrs. Lemon and as Frances Williams and as Mrs. Kummer and as Mrs. Guadalla
- Dorothy Patten and as Miss Simmonds
