= Russell Collins =

American actor

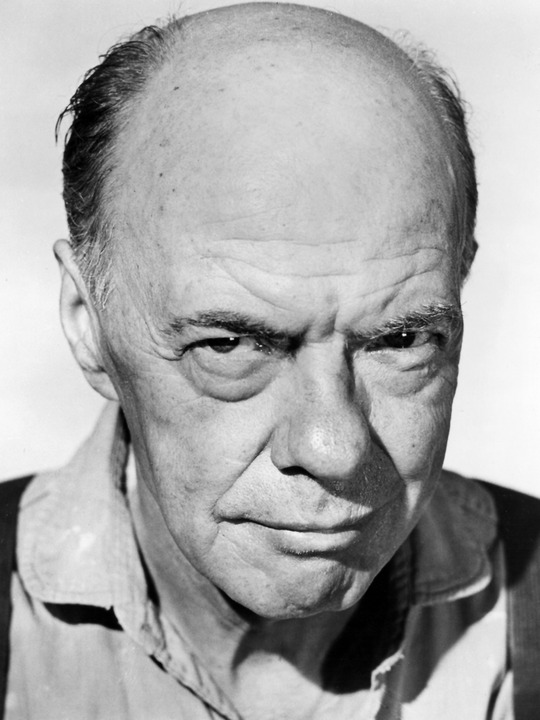
- Collins in 1958
- Born: Russell Henry Collins; October 11, 1897; Indianapolis, Indiana, U.S.
- Died: November 14, 1965 (aged 68); West Hollywood, California, U.S.
- Occupation: Actor
- Years active: 1922–1965

Russell Collins (born Russell Henry Collins; October 11, 1897 – November 14, 1965) was an American actor whose 43-year career included hundreds of performances on stage, in feature films, and on television.

== Early life ==
Collins was born in 1897 in Indianapolis, Indiana, the middle child of Emma (née Hughes) and Martin F. Collins' five children. He had a younger brother and sister, Raymond and Maxina, as well as an older brother and sister, Oren and Irene. By 1910, Russell's father had become disabled and jobless, so his mother supported him and the rest of the family by working as a seamstress from their home. Emma's responsibilities for the family were so predominant, in fact, that she is identified in the 1910 United States census as "Head" of the Collins' household.

As a student in the Drama School at Carnegie Tech, Collins "first learned his trade in the days immediately following World War I." He also attended Indiana University and Northwestern University.

== Career ==
Collins had roles in a few early Group Theatre productions with Success Story being his Broadway debut. Probably his most noted Broadway role was as the star of the 1935 musical play Johnny Johnson. He enjoyed a long career on Broadway, although by the late 1940s, he began to perform increasingly in Hollywood films and on television, where he appeared in teleplay dramas, as well as on Westerns, sitcoms, and on an array of other weekly series. He remained in high demand as a character actor and worked on television to shortly before his death. His 1957 appearance in the Alfred Hitchcock Presents episode "The Night the World Ended" was a typical TV role, as was his 1962 role as a caring town doctor in “The Nancy Davis Story” on the TV Western Wagon Train (S5E33).

He played Doc in the 1950 London production of Mr. Roberts at the Coliseum Theatre with Tyrone Power as Mr. Roberts and Jackie Cooper as Ensign Pulver.

== Death ==
He died November 14, 1965, in West Hollywood, California. His gravesite is located in the Elsinore Valley Cemetery at Lake Elsinore, California.

== Selected Broadway roles ==
- Success Story (1932) as Harry Fisher
- Both Your Houses (1933) as Peebles
- Men in White (1933) as Dr. Cunningham
- Gentlewoman (1934) as Havens
- Gold Eagle Guy (1934) as a deserter and as Ed Walker
- Till the Day I Die (1935) as Schlupp
- Waiting For Lefty (1935) as Fatt and as Fayette and as Reilly
- Paradise Lost (1935) as Homeless Man
- Johnny Johnson (1935) as Johnny Johnson
- The Star-Wagon (1937) as Hanus Wicks
- Missouri Legend (1938) as Jim Cummins
- Here Come the Clowns (1938) as John Dickinson
- Morning's at Seven (1939) as Carl Bolton
- The Moon is Down (1942) as Major Hunter
- Carousel (1945) as Starkeeper and as Dr. Seldon
- The Iceman Cometh (1946) as James Cameron
- The Liar (1950) as Brighelia
- Sabrina Fair (1953) as Fairchild
- Sunrise at Campobello (1958) as Louis McHenry Howe (replacement)
- Romulus (1962) as Achilles
- Calculated Risk (1962) as Jonathan Travis

== Filmography ==
Year	Title	Role	Notes
1943	Seeds of Freedom		
1948	Close-Up	Beck	
1949	Shockproof	Frederick Bauer	
1949	The Walking Hills	Bibbs	
1950	The Sleeping City	Medical Examiner	Uncredited
1953	Niagara	Mr. Qua	
1953	Destination Gobi	Lieutenant Commander Hobart Wyatt	
1953	Monte Carlo Baby	Max	
1953	Miss Sadie Thompson	Dr. Robert MacPhail	
1955	Bad Day at Black Rock	Mr. Hastings	
1955	Canyon Crossroads	Dr. Andrew Rand	
1955	Soldier of Fortune	Icky	
1955	The Last Frontier	Captain Phil Clarke	
1956	Alfred Hitchcock Presents	John Brown	Season 2 Episode 14: "John Brown's Body"
1957	Alfred Hitchcock Presents	Skinner #21	Season 2 Episode 21: "Number Twenty-Two"
1957	Alfred Hitchcock Presents	Johnny	Season 2 Episode 31: "The Night the World Ended"
1957	Alfred Hitchcock Presents	Clarence Weems	Season 2 Episode 37: "The Indestructible Mr. Weems"
1957	Alfred Hitchcock Presents	Ed Barnes	Season 3 Episode 13 "Night of the Execution"
1957	Raintree County	Niles Foster	
1957	The Enemy Below	Doctor	
1958	The Matchmaker	Joe Scanlon	
1958	Alfred Hitchcock Presents	Bill Finley	Season 4 Episode 12: "Mrs. Herman and Mrs. Fenimore"
1958	God's Little Acre	Watchman	
1958	The Rifleman	Mr Denton	Season 1 Episode 6: "Eight Hours to Die"
1959	Alfred Hitchcock Presents	Dad	Season 4 Episode 23: "I'll Take Care of You"
1959	The Rabbit Trap	Hughie Colt	
1961	Alfred Hitchcock Presents	Alvin Moss	Season 6 Episode 27: "Deathmate"
1961	Alfred Hitchcock Presents	Mr. Fletcher	Season 7 Episode 11: "The Right Kind of Medicine"
1962	The Twilight Zone	Ben Conroy	Season 3 Episode 21: "Kick the Can"
1963	The Alfred Hitchcock Hour	Sam Brody	Season 2 Episode 7: "Starring the Defense"
1964	Fail-Safe	Gordon Knapp	
1965	Those Calloways	Nat Perkins	
1965	When the Boys Meet the Girls	Mr. Stokes	
