= Margaret Barker (actress) =

American actor, director, and writer (1908–1992)

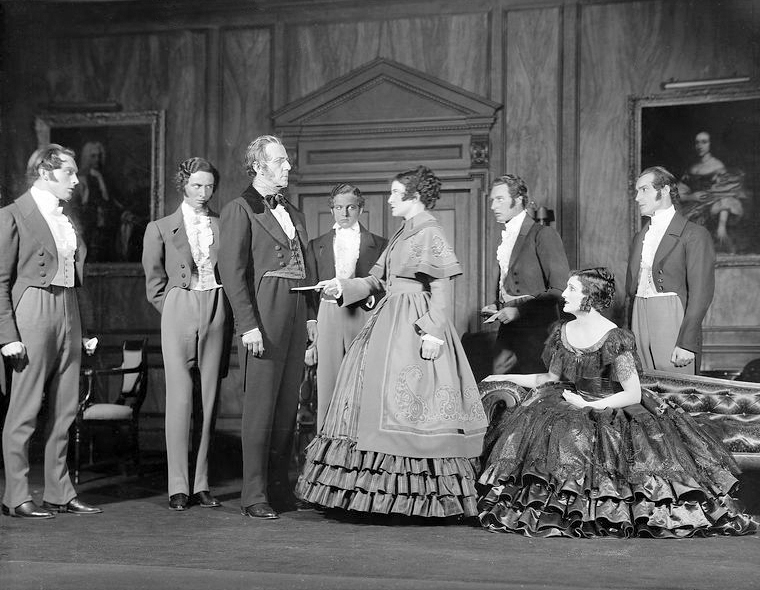
Margaret Barker (center with letter in hand) as Henrietta Moulton-Barrett in Rudolf Besier's The Barretts of Wimpole Street in 1931

Margaret Taylor Barker (October 10, 1908 – April 3, 1992) was an American actress, director, producer, educator, and playwright. A native of Baltimore, she was the daughter of physician Lewellys Franklin Barker. She began her career in 1926 and was a leading ingénue on Broadway during the late 1920s. She was a founding member of New York City's Group Theatre with whom she performed from 1931 to 1937, including in many Broadway productions. In 1937, she co-founded the Studio Workshop Theatre with Frank Westbrook and Felicia Sorel. She taught theatre courses with that organization through 1941.

After experiencing disappointment from the end of her romantic relationship with the actor Alexander Kirkland in c. 1941, Barker became an alcoholic, which led to a lapse in her career during World War II. She got sober and resumed performing in 1946. She was active once again on Broadway during the late 1940s and early 1950s. Afterwards, she continued to perform, direct, and produce plays Off-Broadway and in American regional theatre into the 1980s. Her play A Moonlit Dome was staged in New York in 1962.

Barker made her screen debut in the 1949 film Lost Boundaries. She made very few films, but was active as a television actress on a variety of programs from the 1950s into the 1980s. She frequently appeared in television plays in anthology series programs like Goodyear Television Playhouse, Kraft Television Theatre, and Studio One among others. She was also active in television soap operas, portraying Grace Harris Tyrel on The Secret Storm, Sophia Slocum on For Richer, For Poorer, and Leueen Parrish on Another World. Her final screen appearance was a minor role in the 1992 film Fathers & Sons.

== Early life and education ==
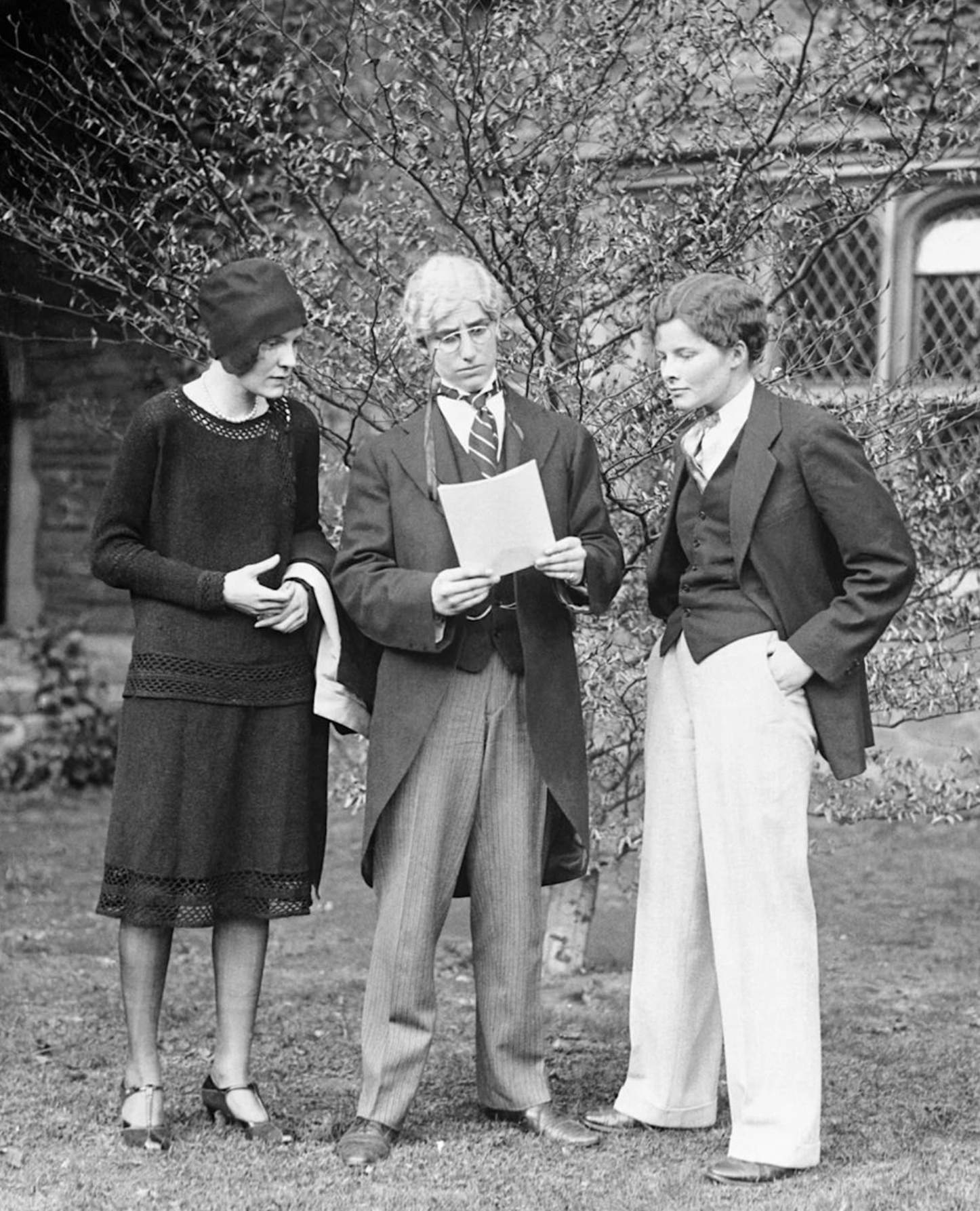
Barker (left) rehearses with Elizabeth Stewart (center), and Katharine Hepburn (right) for Bryn Mawr College's 1927 varsity play.

The daughter of Lewellys Franklin Barker and his wife Lillian Halsey Barker, Margaret T. Barker was born in Baltimore, Maryland on October 10, 1908. Her father was a medical doctor from Canada who had come to the United States to join William Osler's clinic at Johns Hopkins Hospital (JHH) in 1892. He ultimately succeeded Barker as director of medicine and physician-in-chief at JHH in 1905. Her brother, William Halsey Barker, was also a physician, and a second brother, John, was institutionalized due to illness.

In her growing up years, Barker was educated at the Bryn Mawr School and Calvert School in Baltimore. After this she attended Bryn Mawr College (BMC) where she acted alongside Katharine Hepburn in plays staged at the school. She and Hepburn became friends and in letters to each other Hepburn would call her by the nickname "Beanie" and Barker would call Hepburn by the nickname "Kaydiddle". Other classmates at BMC included actresses Mildred Natwick and Eleanor Phelps.

A lifelong learner, Barker later studied with Robert Lewis, founder of the Actors Studio in the early 1950s and attended the Royal Central School of Speech and Drama in 1954 where she studied with Cicely Berry. She took courses at Columbia University in 1957, and studied painting with Minoru Kawabata at The New School in the 1960s. She was also coached in Shakespeare repertoire by Helen Hayes.

== Early career in the theatre ==
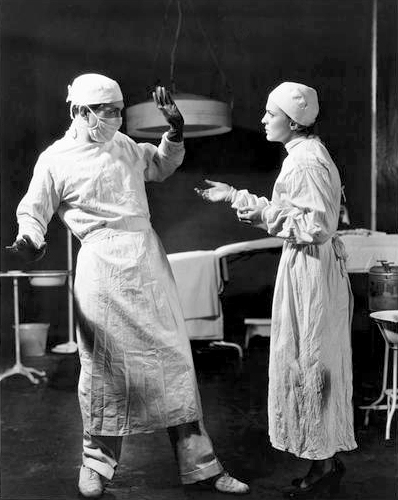
Alexander Kirkland and Margaret Barker in the Group Theatre's Broadway production of Men in White (1933)

Barker's first appearance as a professional actress was performing for the Bachelor's Cotillion in Baltimore in 1926. In her early career she had success as an ingénue on Broadway in two plays starring Katharine Cornell at the Empire Theatre: portraying Alice Fordyce in Margaret Ayer Barnes's The Age of Innocence (1928–1929), and Henrietta Moulton-Barrett in Rudolf Besier's The Barretts of Wimpole Street (1931). After leaving the latter production she became a founding member of New York City's Group Theatre (GT) in 1931. She had earlier performed in a theater troupe led by George Cukor in Rochester, New York, in 1929, and spent time performing at Jessie Bonstelle's Detroit Civic Theatre. In the 1930s she received love letters from actors Alan Baxter and Clifford Odets while working for the GT. She wrote the play The Unpossessed, which was submitted for performance to the GT in 1936 but was rejected. The group did perform one of her short sketches in 1932.

With the GT, Barker had leading roles in the Broadway productions of Paul Green's The House of Connelly (1931, as Patsy Tate at the Martin Beck Theatre); Maxwell Anderson's Night Over Taos (1932, as Raquel at the 48th Street Theatre); John Howard Lawson's Success Story (1932–1933, as Miss Farley at Maxine Elliott's Theatre); Stanley Kimmel's Black Diamond (1933, as Laura at the Provincetown Playhouse); Henry and Sylvia Lieferant's Hilda Cassidy (1933, as Claire Cassidy at the Martin Beck Theatre) Sidney S. Kingsley's Men in White (1933–1934, as Laura Hudson at the Broadhurst Theatre); Melvin Levy's Gold Eagle Guy (1934–1935, as Jessie Sargent at the Morosco Theatre); Clifford Odets's Till the Day I Die (1935, as Tillie at the Longacre Theatre); Nellise Child's Weep for the Virgins (1935 as Mrs. Bean and Mrs. Carsons at the 46th Street Theatre), and Erwin Piscator and Lena Goldschmidt's Case of Clyde Griffiths (1936 as Sondra Finchley at the Ethel Barrymore Theatre).

In 1937, Barker was dismissed from her position at the GT due to internal conflicts between warring factions in the organization, learning about her dismissal after returning from a tour to Russia with Norris Houghton. After this she worked in stock theatre and was director of the apprenticeship program at the Southampton Playhouse in the summer of 1938. Later that same year she co-founded the Studio Workshop Theatre (SWT) in New York City with Frank Westbrook and Felicia Sorel. The trio taught classes in theatre and dance through 1941. One of Barker's students at SWT was Jerome Robbins.

In 1940, Barker joined the second road company of George S. Kaufman and Moss Hart's The Man Who Came to Dinner, a screwball comedy which had concurrent national touring companies. She portrayed the role of the secretary, Maggie Cutler, in this production with Taylor Holmes as Sheridan Whiteside. In 1941, she worked as the director of the apprenticeship program at the Hilltop Theatre in Ellicott City, Maryland, where she also performed in several plays.

== Alcoholism and life during World War II ==
Barker never married and did not have children. In the early 1940s she was engaged to actor Alexander Kirkland with a planned wedding in 1942, but this marriage never came about, with Kirkland marrying Gypsy Rose Lee instead in 1942. She became an alcoholic following the collapse of this relationship. She briefly served in the WAVES during World War II, but her drinking problem led to her dismissal. She spent time getting sober and working in a factory operated by the Bendix Corporation in Baltimore for the remainder of the war. She later began associations with the Alcoholics Anonymous program and the Analytical Psychology Club of New York in the 1950s, both in support of her sobriety.

== Later career ==
=== Stage work ===
After a five year absence from the stage, Barker moved back to New York where she became active with the experimental theatre program of the American National Theater and Academy which was directed by Robert Schnitzer. She appeared in several production with this organization from 1947 to 1949, among them Miss Queen in John Finch's The Wanhope Building at Broadway's Princess Theatre in 1947. Other Broadway credits soon followed including Annie in Ruth Gordon's The Leading Lady (1948, National Theatre); Mrs. West in Carson McCullers's The Member of the Wedding (1950–1951, Empire Theatre); Carrie Ellis in Lillian Hellman's The Autumn Garden (1951, Coronet Theatre); and Mrs. Wilkins in N. Richard Nash's See the Jaguar (1952, Cort Theatre) which starred James Dean. Her final Broadway appearance was as Constance Mercer in Dorothy Parker and Arnaud D'Usseau's The Ladies of the Corridor at the Longacre Theatre in 1953.

Barker was also active as both an actress and director for Off-Broadway productions. She was a member of the Circle Repertory Company. In 1963, she produced the Off-Broadway production of Color of Darkness: An Evening in the World of James Purdy at the Writers Theatre, and in 1966 she was associate producer of Stanley Mann's Rooms at the Cherry Lane Theatre. Outside of New York she performed frequently at the Williamstown Theatre Festival (WTF) for approximately ten years during the 1950s and 1960s. Some of the WTF productions she performed in included Pygmalion (1959, as Mrs Higgins), The Diary of Anne Frank (1959, as Mrs. Frank), The Visit (1960, as Frau Schill), Look Homeward, Angel (1960, as Eliza Gant), The Dark at the Top of the Stairs (1960, as Cora Flood), Toys in the Attic (1961, as Anna Berniers), The Seagull (1962, as Polina Andreyevna), Cat on a Hot Tin Roof (1965, as Big Mama), The Three Sisters (1965, as Anfisa), The Subject Was Roses (1966, as Nettie Cleary), A Delicate Balance (1967, as Agnes), and Peer Gynt (1967, as Aase).

In 1962, Barker's play A Moonlit Dome was staged at the Shirley Broughton Studio in New York City with a cast led by Charles Kimbrough. Her late career performances included A. R. Gurney's The Wayside Motor Inn (1977, Manhattan Theatre Club), Elizabeth Diggs's Close Ties (1980, Lexington Conservatory Theatre; 1981, Long Wharf Theatre) and Moliere's Tartuffe (1982, Kennedy Center). From 1979 to 1982 she served on the board of the Manhattan Punch Line Theatre.

=== Television and film ===
Barker made her screen debut as Nurse Richmond in the 1949 biographical drama film Lost Boundaries which dealt with a black physician passing as white in a New England town. She made only a few more minor film appearances late in her career, appearing as a wealthy matron in the 1986 film Power and as an old lady in the 1992 film Fathers & Sons. She also performed in one television film, portraying Mary Hope in Lethal Innocence, a drama about American-Cambodian relations that was partially filmed in Thailand.

In the 1950s, Barker performed in several anthology television programs featuring television plays, beginning with a role in Three Letters on the Goodyear Television Playhouse program in April 1952. This was followed by the role of Aunt Gert in Horton Foote's A Young Lady of Property on The Philco Television Playhouse in 1953, and a role in Reginald Lawrence's The Atherton Boy on Kraft Television Theatre in 1954. She portrayed Alden Blaine in a television adaptation George Brewer Jr. and Bertram Bloch's 1934 play Dark Victory on the program Pond's Theater in March 1954. In 1955, she starred in the play Heart Song on Studio One, and in 1956 she portrayed Alice Sharrod in The Hat With the Roses on General Electric Theater. Other early television work included guest appearances on Danger (1951–1954), The Mail Story (1954), You Are There (1954), and The Stranger (1954).

Barker made two appearances on the Camera Three anthology series in the early 1960s, appearing in the episodes "The Destroyer" (1960) and "A Simple Heart" (1961). She also appeared in the episode "The Hidden World" on the Armstrong Circle Theatre in 1960. In 1962, she was a guest star on Look Up and Live and The Defenders (1962). In 1964 she had a starring role in an episode of the primetime medical drama The Nurses. In 1966, she portrayed a Store Person in Stephen Sondheim and James Goldman's television musical special " Evening Primrose" on the program ABC Stage 67.

Barker was a cast member of several soap operas, including portraying Grace Harris Tyrel on The Secret Storm in 1969–1970, Sophia Slocum on For Richer, For Poorer in 1977–1978 and Leueen Parrish on Another World in 1978–1979. She also appeared as a guest on the soap operas Love of Life and The Edge of Night (1970). From 1963 to 1973, she appeared in 61 episodes of The Doctors.

== Later life and death ==
In the 1950s and 1960s Barker was an active member of the Cosmopolitan Club, and director of several amateur drama productions put on by the group. In her later life from the 1970s onward, she divided her time between homes in Fairfield, Connecticut and Vers, France.

Barker died of lung cancer on April 3, 1992, in New York City at the age 83. Her obituary stated that Ann Macfarlane was her longtime partner. Her personal paper are held in the New York Public Library archives. The archives mention both Macfarlane and the artist Halley Erskine as her companions. (Note: It is unclear from the archive description as to the exact nature of these relationships. It is possible that Barker was in lesbian relationships with these women, but it is also possible they merely lived together and were just close friends and roommates. Sources have not yet addressed Barker's sexuality.)

== Notes and references ==
=== Sources ===
- Blum, Daniel (1952). "Barker, Margaret". Daniel Blum's Theatre World. Seasone 1951–1952. Vol. Eight. Greenberg Publisher.
- Bordman, Gerald (1996). American Theatre: A Chronicle of Comedy and Drama, 1930–1969. New York: Oxford University Press. ISBN 0-19-535808-2. OCLC 252547085.
- Chapman, John, ed. (1949). The Best Plays of 1948–1949 and the Year Book of the Drama in America. Dodd, Mead & Company.
- Chinoy, Helen Krich (2013). The Group Theatre: Passion, Politics, and Performance in the Depression Era. Palgrave Macmillan. ISBN 9781137294609.
- Chance, Norman (2011). Who was Who on TV. Vol. III. ISBN 9781456824563.
- Connelly, Mark (2024). The Group Theatre: An Enduring Legacy. McFarland & Company. ISBN 9781476677118.
- Gevinson, Alan (1997). Within Our Gates: Ethnicity in American Feature Films, 1911–1960. University of California Press. ISBN 9780520209640.
- Gianakos, Larry James (1978). Television Drama Series Programming: A Comprehensive Chronicle, 1959–1975. Scarecrow Press.
- Hischak, Thomas S. (2014). American Plays and Musicals on Screen: 650 Stage Productions and Their Film and Television Adaptations. McFarland & Company. ISBN 9780786420032.
- Jones, Richard (2021). "Harold Clurman, the Group, and the Legacy of the Director". In Chambers, Jonathan (ed.). Great North American Stage Directors. Vol. 2, Clurmen, Welles, Jones. Bloomsbury Publishing. ISBN 9781350189348.
- Kabatchnik, Amnon (2010). Blood on the Stage, 1925–1950: Milestone Plays of Crime, Mystery, and Detection: An Annotated Repertoire. Scarecrow Press. ISBN 9780810869639.
- Mantle, Burns, ed. (1929). "The Age of Innocence". The Best Plays of 1928–1929 and the Year Book of the Drama in America. Dodd, Mead & Company.
- Mantle, Burns, ed. (1933). The Best Plays of 1932–1933 and the Year Book of the Drama in America. Dodd, Mead & Company.
- Mantle, Burns, ed. (1936). The Best Plays of 1935–1936 and the Year Book of the Drama in America. Dodd, Mead & Company.
- McNeil, Alex (1997). Total Television: The Comprehensive Guide to Programming from 1948 to the Present. Penguin Books. ISBN 9780140267372.
- Mizruchi, Susan L. (2014). Brando's Smile: His Life, Thought, and Work. W. W. Norton & Company.
- Ochoa, Sheana (2014). Stella!: Mother of Modern Acting. Applause Theatre & Cinema Books.
- Pender, Rick (2021). The Stephen Sondheim Encyclopedia. Rowman & Littlefield Publishers. ISBN 9781538115879.
- Schemering, Christopher (1988). The Soap Opera Encyclopedia. Ballantine Books. ISBN 9780345353443.
- Smith, Wendy (2013). Real Life Drama: The Group Theatre and America 1931–1940. Knopf Doubleday Publishing Group. ISBN 9780345805997.
- Woodward, Byerly, ed. (1987). Annual Index to Motion Picture Credits, 1986. Academy of Motion Picture Arts & Sciences. ISBN 9780942102055.
