= Night Over Taos =

1932 Broadway three-act drama written by Maxwell Anderson

- Written by: Maxwell Anderson
- Original language: English
- Genre: Drama
- Setting: great hall of Montoya hacienda in Taos, New Mexico 1847

Premiere
- Date premiered: March 9, 1932
- Place premiered: 48th Street Theatre; New York City, New York

Night Over Taos was a 1932 Broadway three-act drama written by Maxwell Anderson, produced by the Group Theatre and staged by Lee Strasberg. It was the Group Theatre's third production. It ran for 13 performances from March 9, 1936 closing that month at the 48th Street Theatre.

It was revived off Broadway in 2007, directed by Estelle Parsons.

== Cast ==
- Luther Adler as Don Fernando
- Stella Adler as Dona Josefa
- Harry Bellaver as Diego
- Phoebe Brand as Nuna
- J. Edward Bromberg as Pablo Montoya
- Morris Carnovsky as Father Martinez
- William Challee as second trapper
- Grover Burgess as third trapper
- Walter Coy as Felipe
- Gerrit Kraber as Santos
- Lewis Leverett as Don Hermano
- Robert Lewis as Indian slave
- Sanford Meisner as Don Miguel
- Mary Morris as Dona Vera
- Ruth Nelson as Diana
- Clifford Odets as Mateo
- Dorothy Patten as Carlota
- Art Smith as Captain Mumford
- Eunice Stoddard as Lita
- Franchot Tone as Federico
- Margaret Barker as Raquel
- Clement Wilenchick as Andros
- Gertrude Maynard as Conchita
- Virginia Farmer as Valeria
- Sylvia Feningston as Cristina
- Friendly Ford as Graso
- Paula Miller as Maria
- Herbert Ratner as Narciso
- Philip Robinson as Don Mario
