= Method – Or Madness? =

1957 series of lectures by Robert Lewis

- First edition
- Author: Robert Lewis
- Language: English
- Genre: Non-fiction
- Publisher: Samuel French Ltd.
- Publication date: 1958
- Publication place: United States

Method – Or Madness? was the title of a series of lectures given by Actors Studio founder Robert Lewis in New York in 1957, and later published as a book of the same title.

== The Lectures ==
The first of the eight lectures was presented on the stage of the Playhouse Theatre in New York City, at 11:30 P.M. on the evening of April 15, 1957, to a standing room only audience of professional actors, directors and writers. The lectures embodied an attempt by Mr. Lewis, an early student of the Stanislavski System, or "method" of acting, to dispel what he considered to be myths and misinformation surrounding the various interpretations of Stanislavski, which had all become popularly, and in some cases inaccurately, known as "The Method."

== The Book ==
The book, Method – Or Madness? by Robert Lewis was published in 1958 by Samuel French, Inc.

In his introduction for the book, Harold Clurman referred to the lectures as "a kind of codicil to the classics of the subject, the three books by Constantin Stanislavski." He went on to say "The distinguishing feature of the Lewis lectures, beside their humor, is their common sense."

Because of the widespread confusion and misinformation regarding Constantin Stanislavski and Lee Strasberg's acting technique, lumping the notions all under the blanket term "The Method," Lewis taught lectures to fuse the two ideas.

Method — Or Madness? has been translated into several languages, but is currently available only through secondhand shops.
