= Alexander Kirkland =

American actor (1901–c.1986)

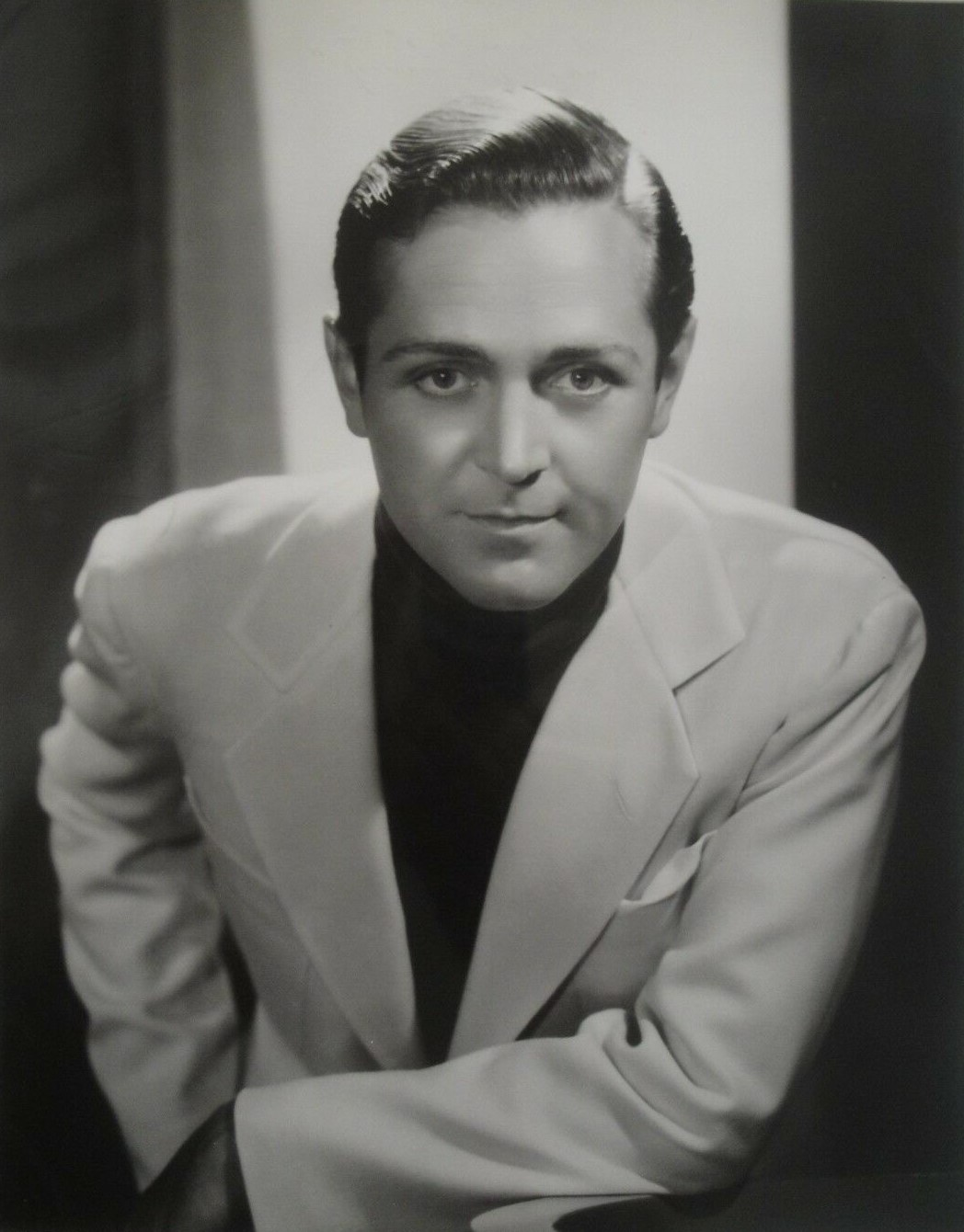
- Born: William Alexander Kirkland; September 15, 1901; Mexico City, Mexico
- Died: c. 1986; Alimodian, Iloilo, Philippines
- Occupations: Actor, screenwriter
- Years active: 1929–1957
- Spouses: Gypsy Rose Lee (m. 1942; div. 1944) Phyllis Adams Jenkins (m. 1944; div. 1950) Greta Jacqueline "Jackie" Baldridge (m. 1959; died 1972)

William Alexander Kirkland (September 15, 1901, Mexico City, Mexico – c. 1986) was a leading man in Hollywood during the early sound era as well as a stage actor who starred in productions of the Group Theatre in New York.

== Biography ==
Kirkland was born on September 15, 1901, in Mexico City, the son of Robert Gowland Kirkland and Charlotte Megan. He was the grandson of rear admiral William Alexander Kirkland and Consuela Gowland.

Kirkland attended the Taft School in Watertown, Connecticut and the University of Virginia. He later attended the Pennsylvania Academy of Fine Arts, and while in Philadelphia, he began his acting career at the Hedgerow Theatre in Media, Pennsylvania. His first play on Broadway was The Devil to Pay. He starred as Marius in the 1930 Broadway production of Marseilles.

He was also a freelance writer and contributed stories to popular national magazines. In the late 1920s, Kirkland moved to Hollywood and starred as leading man to Tallulah Bankhead in Tarnished Lady (1931). Other credits include Charlie Chan's Chance (1932), Social Register (1934) A Face in the Crowd (1957), A Passport to Hell and Devil's Lottery.

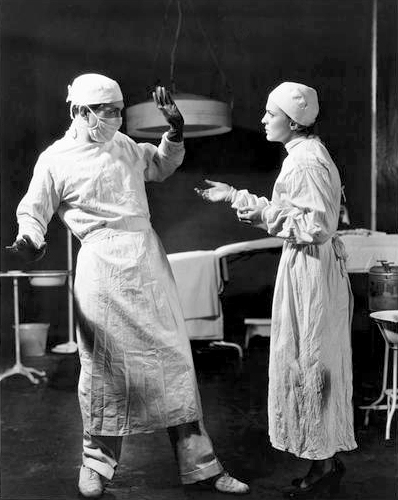
Alexander Kirkland and Margaret Barker in the Group Theatre's Broadway production of Men in White (1933)

In the 1930s, he was associated with the Group Theatre (New York), founded by Harold Clurman, Cheryl Crawford and Lee Strasberg.

On radio, Kirkland played David Brewster in the soap opera Big Sister in the early 1940s, Curt Lansing in John's Other Wife, and Russell Barrington in Society Girl in that same era.

He toured as one of the Yale Puppeteers and then worked with the troupe at the Turnabout Theatre in Los Angeles, which operated from 1941 to 1956. His friend and theater colleague Forman Brown used him as the model for one of his characters in the early gay novel Better Angel (1933).

Kirkland was engaged to actress Margaret Barker, but a planned wedding in 1942 never came to fruition. He married entertainer Gypsy Rose Lee in 1942. Carl Van Doren introduced them. They separated after three months and finally were divorced in 1944. Their son Erik later was recognized as the son of director Otto Preminger.

From 1944 to 1950, he was married to socialite, actress, and TV producer Phyllis Adams (1923-2004), and they had one daughter, Alexandra "Sandy" Marsh, who committed suicide falling from the Park Belvedere 28th floor in 1987. Adams later remarried in 1955 to art director George Jenkins.

In the 1950s, Kirkland owned an art gallery in Palm Beach, Florida, and in 1945, he purchased Villa del Sarmiento, an oceanfront Palm Beach estate.

In 1959, he married Greta Hunter-Thompson Baldridge, a former Ziegfeld Follies girl, widow of a co-heir of the National Steel Corporation. They lived in Palm Beach, Fairfield, Connecticut, and Cuernavaca, Mexico. Greta died in 1972 in Mexico City.

After the death of his third wife, Kirkland was connected to British actress Margot Grahame.

At the time of his death, Kirkland was living in Cuernavaca, and his daughter said he had wasted all of his money. He died in Alimodian, Iloilo, Philippines.

== In Literature ==
Forman Brown, early gay novelist and member of the Yale Puppeteers, stated that the character of Tony in his novel Better Angel was based on Kirkland and presumably his own experiences with him.

== Broadway credits ==
- Wings Over Europe (1928)
- Men in White (1933)
- Gold Eagle Guy (1934)
- Till the Day I Die (1935)
- Weep for the Virgins (1935)
- The Case of Clyde Griffiths (1936)
- Many Mansions (1937)

== Filmography ==
This filmography is believed to be complete.

Year	Title	Role	Notes
1931	Tarnished Lady	DeWitt Taylor	
1931	Surrender	Major Dietrich Reichendorf	
1932	Charlie Chan's Chance	John R. Douglas	
1932	Devil's Lottery	Stephen Alden	
1932	Almost Married	Louis Capristi / Charles Pringle	
1932	Strange Interlude	Sam Evans	
1932	A Passport to Hell	Lt. Erich von Sydow	
1933	Humanity	Bill MacDonald	
1933	Black Beauty	Henry Cameron	
1933	Bondage	Dr. Nelson	
1934	The Social Register	Charlie Breene	
1947	13 Rue Madeleine	Briefing Officer	Uncredited
1957	A Face in the Crowd	Jim Collier	
