= Paradise Lost (play) =

1935 drama by Clifford Odets

- First edition 1936
- Original language: English
- Written by: Clifford Odets
- Setting: The Gordon home in an American city

Premiere
- Date: December 9, 1935
- Place: Longacre Theatre; New York City

Paradise Lost is a drama by Clifford Odets that takes place during the Depression. The play was originally produced on Broadway by the Group Theatre in 1935. It was also filmed for television broadcast in 1971.

== Plot summary ==
The play takes place in an unnamed American city during the Depression: act one on Armistice Day in 1932, act two in March 1934, and act three in April 1935. The head of the family, Leo, and his wife Clara are middle-class and prosperous. However, over the course of the play Leo and his partner Sam lose their handbag business and the family must come to terms with this. The other characters in the play include a friend, Gus, and his daughter, Libby, a frivolous and self-centered young woman who is newly married to Leo's son Ben; Mr. Pike, a boarder, and an assortment of other characters.

Odets said of Paradise Lost that he'd hoped that after people see it, "they're going to be glad they're alive."

== Production ==
Directed by Harold Clurman, Paradise Lost premiered on Broadway at the Longacre Theatre in a Group Theatre production. It opened on December 9, 1935, and closed in February 1936 after 73 performances.

=== Cast ===
- Stella Adler as Clara Gordon
- Morris Carnovsky as Leo Gordon
- Walter Coy as Ben Gordon
- Blanche Gladstone as Libby Michaels
- Roman Bohnen as Gus Michaels
- Elia Kazan as Kewpie
- Grover Burgess as Mr. Pike
- Luther Adler as Sam Katz
- Lewis Leverett as Phil Foley
- Sanford Meisner as Julie
- Robert Lewis as Mr. May

== TV revival ==
Paradise Lost
- DVD
- Written by: Clifford Odets
- Starring: Eli Wallach; Jo Van Fleet; George Voskovec; Bernadette Peters; Cliff Gorman; Fred Gwynne
- Country of origin: United States
- Original language: English

Production
- Producers: Glenn Jordan; Jac Venza

Original release
- Release: February 25 – March 4, 1971

Glenn Jordan directed a television revival production of Paradise Lost that was first broadcast on American public television in two parts, on February 25 and March 4, 1971. The editor was Frank Herold and the play was recorded at Teletape Studios, NYC. Herold received a 1972 Emmy Award nomination for video editing.

- Jo Van Fleet as Clara Gordon
- Eli Wallach as Leo Gordon
- Sam Groom as Ben Gordon
- Bernadette Peters as Libby Michaels
- George Voskovec as Gus Michaels
- Cliff Gorman as Kewpie
- Fred Gwynne as Mr. Pike
- Mike Kellin as Sam Katz
- Biff McGuire as Phil Foley

Paradise Lost was released on DVD in April 2002 by Kultur's DVD Broadway Theater Archive. According to Luther Adler in the presentation's intro, Paradise Lost was Clifford Odets' favorite and Harold Clurman considered it one of the six or seven really important contemporary American plays.

== Critical response ==
Brooks Atkinson reviewed the play in The New York Times on December 10, 1935:

"Paradise Lost" is more an exercise in style than an organic drama. ... The style does not flow naturally out of the ... characters who inhabit the play. ... If the design of the play is apparently formless and aimless, that is Mr. Odets's conscious way of reflecting the stalemate lives of the society he is describing. It results in several bold and exhilarating scenes, several vigorous characters, a good deal of sinewy dialogue—and considerable incidental foolishness. ... "Paradise Lost"" is a very mixed package.

The reviewer for The New York Times wrote of the 1971 television film that the play was

an inordinately difficult work, especially on the home screen. ... Mr. Odets piled episode upon episode and remorselessly twirled his sociological revolving door with too many people. ... It is a totality of the vagaries of humanity under varying degrees of despair and hopelessness. ... The inarticulation of people to develop thoughts and philosophies may not make for the most exciting conventional theater but it can be a cameo of persons as they really are, a portrait of society at loose ends.
