= Success Story =

Success Story may refer to:

- Success Story (play), a stage play by playwright and screenwriter John Howard Lawson
- "Success Story" (short story), a 1947 short story by P. G. Wodehouse, featuring the character Ukridge
- Success Story, a 2002 Indian short documentary film about the 1995 Bollywood film Dilwale Dulhania Le Jayenge
- "The Success Story" (Monkees Episode), the sixth episode of the first series of TV show The Monkees
- "Success Story" (song), a song by The Who appearing on their album The Who By Numbers
