= Art Smith (actor) =

American actor (1899–1973)

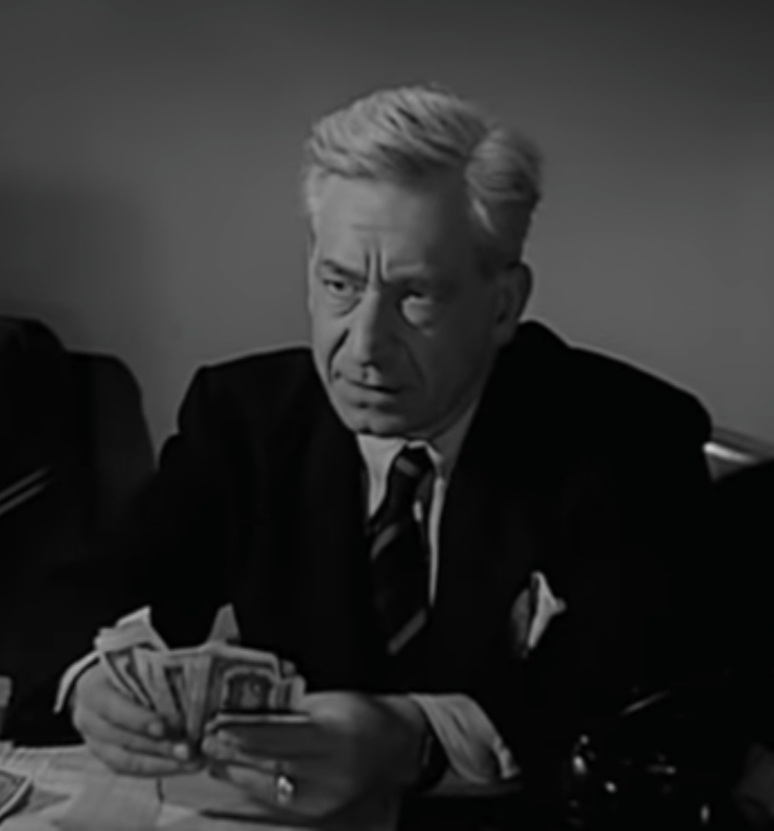
- Smith in Quicksand (1950)
- Born: Arthur Gordon Smith; March 23, 1899; Chicago, Illinois, U.S.
- Died: February 24, 1973 (aged 73); Long Island, New York City, U.S.
- Occupation: Actor
- Years active: 1924–1967

Arthur Gordon Smith (March 23, 1899 – February 24, 1973) was an American stage, film, and television actor, best known for playing supporting roles in Hollywood productions of the 1940s.

== Life and career ==
Born in Chicago, he was a member of the Group Theatre and performed in many of their productions, including Rocket to the Moon, Awake and Sing!, Golden Boy and Waiting for Lefty, all by Clifford Odets; House of Connelly by Paul Green; and Sidney Kingsley's Men in White.

The gray-haired actor usually played studious and dignified types in films, such as doctors or butlers.

Smith appeared in many noirish films, including Body and Soul (1947) and In a Lonely Place (1950). He had a key role as a federal agent in 1947's Ride the Pink Horse, starring and directed by Robert Montgomery. Two of these films, In a Lonely Place and Ride a Pink Horse, were based on novels by Dorothy B. Hughes.

Smith was one of the victims of the Hollywood blacklist, and was fingered as a communist by Elia Kazan during the director's testimony before the HUAC in 1952. This accusation ended the most distinguished portion of his film career. In 1957, he originated the role of Doc in the stage version of West Side Story. Smith returned only occasionally to the film business, for example in an uncredited role as a bathroom attendant in The Hustler. He also worked in a number of top television productions before retiring in 1967.

He died, aged 73, in Long Island, New York, as the result of a heart attack brought on by excessive stress.

== Broadway roles ==
- Broken Dishes (1929) - Sam Green
- The House of Connelly (1931) - Jesse Tate
- Success Story (1932) - Marcus Turner
- Night Over Taos - Captain Mumford
- Awake and Sing! (1935) and (1939) - Myron Berger
- Men in White (1933) - Mr. Hudson
- Waiting For Lefty (1935) - henchman
- Johnny Johnson (1936) - Sgt. Jackson, and as Doctor and as Brother Thomas
- Golden Boy (1937) - Tokio
- Rocket to the Moon (1938) - Phillip Cooper, D.D.S
- My Heart's in the Highlands (1939) - Jasper MacGregor
- West Side Story (1957) - Doc
- All the Way Home (1960) - Father Jackson

== Partial filmography ==
- Nancy Drew... Reporter (1939)
- Education for Death (1943, Short) - Narrator (voice)
- Edge of Darkness (1943) - Knut Osterholm
- Appointment in Berlin (1943) - Dutch Pastor (uncredited)
- Government Girl (1943) - Macqueenie (uncredited)
- None Shall Escape (1944) - Stys
- Uncertain Glory (1944) - Warden (uncredited)
- The Black Parachute (1944) - Joseph - Guerilla (uncredited)
- Mr. Winkle Goes to War (1944) - McDavid, Head of McDavid's School for Boys (uncredited)
- Youth Runs Wild (1944) - Fred Hauser (uncredited)
- None but the Lonely Heart (1944) - Mr. Marjoriebanks (uncredited)
- A Tree Grows in Brooklyn (1945) - Charley (uncredited)
- Framed (1947) - Desk Clerk (uncredited)
- Brute Force (1947) - Dr. Walters
- Ride the Pink Horse (1947) - Bill Retz
- Body and Soul (1947) - David Davis (uncredited)
- T-Men (1947) - Gregg
- A Double Life (1947) - Wigmaker
- Arch of Triumph (1948) - Inspector
- Letter from an Unknown Woman (1948) - John
- Mr. Peabody and the Mermaid (1948) - Dr. Harvey
- Angel in Exile (1948) - Emie Coons
- Chicken Every Sunday (1949) - Mr. Johnson (uncredited)
- Caught (1949) - Psychiatrist
- South of St. Louis (1949) - Bronco
- Manhandled (1949) - Detective Lt. Bill Dawson
- Red, Hot and Blue (1949) - Laddie Corwin
- Song of Surrender (1949) - Mr. Willis
- Quicksand (1950) - Mackey
- In a Lonely Place (1950) - Mel Lippman
- The Next Voice You Hear (1950) - Fred Brannan
- South Sea Sinner (1950) - William Grayson
- The Killer That Stalked New York (1950) - Anthony Moss
- The Sound of Fury (1950) - Hal Clendenning
- The Painted Hills (1951) - Pilot Pete
- Half Angel (1951) - Policeman Dan (uncredited)
- Rose of Cimarron (1952) - Deacon
- Just for You (1952) - Leo
- The Hustler (1961) - Old Man Attendant (uncredited)
- The Moving Finger (1963)
