= Men in White (play) =

1933 play by Sidney Kingsley

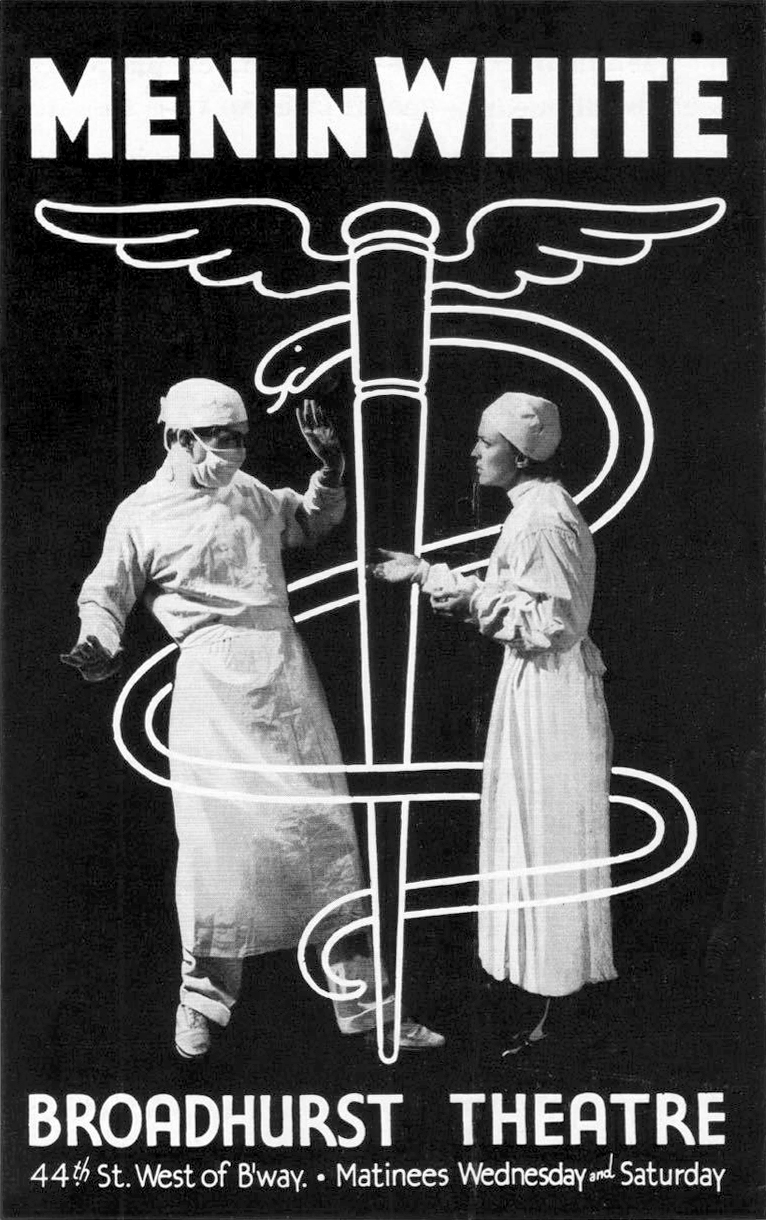
- Handbill for the original Broadway production
- Written by: Sidney Kingsley
- Original language: English
- Genre: Drama
- Setting: St. George's Hospital

Premiere
- Date premiered: September 26, 1933
- Place premiered: Broadhurst Theatre; New York City, New York

Men in White is a 1933 play written by American playwright Sidney Kingsley. It was produced by the Group Theatre, Sidney Harmon and James Ramsey Ullman, directed by Lee Strasberg with scenic design created by Mordecai Gorelik. It ran for 351 performances from September 26, 1933 to July 28, 1934 at the Broadhurst Theatre. The play won the 1934 Pulitzer Prize for Drama.

It was included in Burns Mantle's The Best Plays of 1933–1934.

== Cast ==
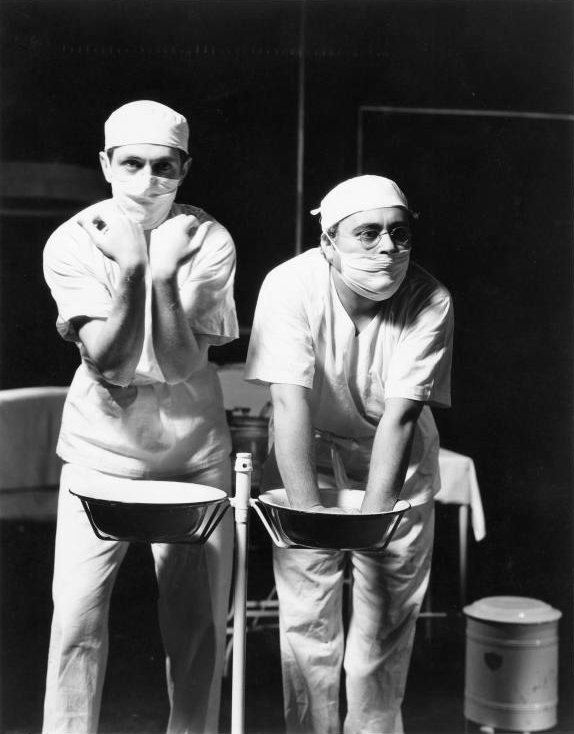
Men in White (1933), winner of the Pulitzer Prize for Drama

- Luther Adler as Dr. Gordon
- Alan Baxter as Dr. Crawford and as Mac
- Phoebe Brand as Barbara Dennin
- Morris Carnovsky as Dr. Levine
- J. Edward Bromberg as Dr. Hochberg
- Grover Burgess as Dr. McCabe
- William Challee as Dr. Michaelson
- Russell Collins as Dr. Cunningham
- Herbert Ratner as Dr. Vitale
- Walter Coy as Dr. Bradley and as Peter
- Robert Harper as Mr. Drummond
- Alexander Kirkland as Dr. Ferguson
- Bob Lewis as Dr. Otis and as Shorty
- Sanford Meisner as Dr. Wren and as Mr. Smith
- Ruth Nelson as Mrs. Smith
- Margaret Barker as Laura Hudson
- Mary Virginia Farmer as Mrs. D'Andrea
- Gerrit Kraber as James Mooney
- Lewis Leverett as Mr. Spencer
- Clifford Odets as Mr. Houghton
- Art Smith as Mr. Hudson
- Mab Maynard as Dorothy Smith
- Dorothy Patten as nurse Mary Ryan
- Eunice Stoddard as nurse Jamison
- Paula Miller as first nurse
- Elena Karam as second nurse
- Elia Kazan as orderly

== Adaptations ==
The play was adapted for the 1934 Metro-Goldwyn-Mayer film Men in White, starring Clark Gable (Dr. Ferguson) and Myrna Loy (Laura Hudson).
