= The Autumn Garden =

- Original language: English
- Written by: Lillian Hellman
- Genre: Drama

Premiere
- Date: March 7, 1951
- Place: Coronet Theatre; New York City

The Autumn Garden is a 1951 play by Lillian Hellman. The play is set in September, 1949 in a summer home in a resort on the Gulf of Mexico, about 100 miles from New Orleans. The play is a study of the defeats, disappointments and diminished expectations of people reaching middle age. For inspiration, Hellman drew on her memories of her time in her aunts' boardinghouse. Dashiell Hammett, who had been Hellman's lover for 20 years, helped her write the play and received 15 percent of the royalties. Of all Hellman's plays it was her favorite.

== Plot ==
The events of the play unfold over the course of one week at Constance Tuckerman's boarding house on the Gulf Coast. A few of her regular guests are enjoying post-dinner cocktails. Rose Griggs is trying to get her husband, General Benjamin Griggs, to admire her dress, which she has put on for a party. Young Frederick Ellis and his grandmother Mrs. Mary Ellis are reading the galleys for a novel that Frederick is about to publish. His mother Carrie Ellis and Edward ("Ned") Crossman are the other guests in the lounge, as the play opens.

Frederick is engaged to be married to Sophie Tuckerman, who was adopted by Constance and brought to America from France when she was 13. She works with Leon to help Constance run the boarding house. Constance is overwrought with anxiety over the impending arrival of Nina and Nicholas Denery, who will spend the weekend at her house. Nicholas was the love of her life, before he left to become an artist in New York.

It does not take long for the fissures in all of the characters' facades to show themselves. The Griggs are elegantly adversarial towards one another. Carrie is desperate to impose her will on her son. Nicholas, contrary to Constance's continued delusion, is a failed artist, and his marriage to Nina is crumbling. Sophie does not love Frederick, but she believes marrying him will be an acceptable way to end her dead-end existence in the boarding house. Constance is horrified to realize that Sophie will not marry for love, and insists, despite all the evidence surrounding her to the contrary, that marriages must be based on love.

As the week progresses, the characters grow more disillusioned with themselves and each other. Nicholas gets frightfully drunk one night and breaks up with Nina again. Later, he propositions Sophie, who allows him to kiss her. He passes out in her bed. The next morning, the house is scandalized by his presence in her bed, knowing that the neighbors can see through the window, and Sophie will be the talk of the town.

As Nina is leaving, Nicholas talks his way back into her heart, and she is happy to continue their destructive cycle by reuniting. Before she leaves, Nina is cornered by Sophie who demands $5,000 for the shame that Nicholas has caused her. Revealing how sophisticated she really is, she consoles Nina to not think of it as blackmail, but so much as a premium to be paid for the privilege of continuing to play at happiness with Nicholas a little while longer. Nina agrees to pay her the money. Sophie decides that she will use it to return to France.

Rose Griggs presents a letter from her doctor to the General. He has asked her for a divorce, but she reveals that she has heart trouble that could kill her. The doctor's note explains that with the right treatment, she could be healthy again in a year. She begs the General to stay with her for the year and promises to divorce him afterward. The General agrees, and confesses to Edward Crossman that he was almost relieved to have an excuse to not go through with the divorce. Constance finally confesses to Edward her feelings for him, and she asks him to marry her. He declines, explaining that he is just a drunk, who gets drunker every year. He confesses that coming to her boarding house every year is a vain attempt to sustain the illusion of a dignified life that he does not actually live.

== Principal opening night cast ==
- Florence Eldridge ..... Rose Griggs
- Ethel Griffies ..... Mrs. Mary Ellis
- Colin Keith-Johnston ..... General Benjamin Griggs
- Kent Smith ..... Edward Crossman
- James Lipton ..... Frederick Ellis
- Margaret Barker ..... Carrie Ellis
- Joan Lorring ..... Sophie Tuckerman
- Maxwell Glanville ..... Leon
- Carol Goodner ..... Constance Tuckerman
- Fredric March ..... Nicholas Denery
- Jane Wyatt ..... Nina Denery
- Lois Holmes ..... Hilda

== Original Broadway production ==
Kermit Bloomgarden produced and Harold Clurman directed the Broadway production that opened on March 7, 1951, at the Coronet Theatre (now the Eugene O'Neill Theatre), where it ran for 101 performances. Incidental music was composed by Marc Blitzstein, scenic and lighting design were by Howard Bay, and costume design was by Anna Hill Johnstone.

=== Critical reception ===
Hellman's previous work had drawn on the social realism of Henrik Ibsen. In The Autumn Garden the critics perceived an influence of the works of Anton Chekhov. Individual critics had mixed feelings about the play, finding the characters dislikable and the conclusion unsatisfying but still considering it her best work.

For example, John Gassner was not satisfied with the play but nevertheless voted for it to win the New York Drama Critics' Circle Award. New York Times critic Brooks Atkinson had both praise and criticism, calling it "scrupulous" and the characterization, "written...of knowledge and integrity", but the play "boneless and torpid.".

=== Awards and nominations ===
The Autumn Garden was nominated for, but did not win, the New York Drama Critics Circle Award. Richard Raven won the 1951 Tony Award for Best Stage Technician for his work on the Broadway production.
