= Success Story (play) =

- Original language: English
- Written by: John Howard Lawson
- Genre: Drama
- Setting: Office in New York City headquarters of Raymond Merritt Company

Premiere
- Date: September 26, 1932
- Place: Maxine Elliott's Theatre; New York City, New York

Success Story was a 1932 Broadway three-act drama written by John Howard Lawson, produced by the Group Theatre and staged by Lee Strasberg with Scenic design by Mordecai Gorelik. It ran for 121 performances from September 26, 1932, to January 1933 at the Maxine Elliott's Theatre. This was actor Russell Collins' Broadway debut. Actors William Challee and Ruth Nelson were a married couple.

== Plot ==
In 1928 young Sol Ginsberg joins a Madison Avenue advertising agency. Formerly a radical idealist his philosophy changes to money as being the culmination of the American Dream. He starts to compromise his former ideals to advance his career, risking losing the faith of his childhood sweetheart and in himself.

== Cast ==
- Luther Adler as Sol Ginsberg
- Stella Adler as Sarah Glassman
- Morris Carnovsky as Rufus Sonnenberg
- William Challee as Jeffery Haliburton
- Russell Collins as Harry Fisher
- Ruth Nelson as Dinah McCabe
- Art Smith as Marcus Turner
- Franchot Tone as Raymond Merritt
- Margaret Barker as Miss Farley
- Dorothy Patten as Agnes Carter
