= Nellise Child =

American dramatist

Nellise Child (died June 11, 1981) was an American novelist and playwright.

== Biography ==
Born Lillian Gerard, she changed her name to Nellise Child in an homage to her mother (i.e. "Nelly's child"). Child published eight novels, including Murder Comes Home (1933), The Diamond Ransom Murders (1935), Wolf on the Fold (1941), and If I Come Home (1944).

She also wrote plays, including Sister Oakes and After the Gleaners. Her play Weep for the Virgins was produced by the Group Theatre in 1935, directed by Cheryl Crawford. It was about three working-class sisters dreaming of a better life, and its setting was based on her own experiences working in a California fish cannery. The New York Times called the production "humid and amorphous," and it ran for only nine performances.

Come to the Dance, a comedy originally titled Happy Ending, was produced in Miami in 1959 at the Coconut Grove Playhouse. It starred Dennis King and Isobel Elsom and featured Irene Castle in a supporting role. Happy Ending was then produced under its original title in 1960 at the Bucks County Playhouse. That production starred Ruth Chatterton and Conrad Nagel.

She was married to Abner G. Rosenfeld, with whom she had one son, Frank Redfield. Nellise Child died on June 11, 1981, in Chicago, Illinois, at the age of 79.
