= Group Theatre (New York City) =

Theater collective in New York City, US

- The Group Theatre at Pine Brook Country Club in 1936
- Formation: 1931
- Dissolved: 1941
- Type: Theatre group
- Location: New York City
- Artistic directors: Harold Clurman; Cheryl Crawford; Lee Strasberg
- Notable members: Luther Adler; Stella Adler; Robert Ardrey; Margaret Barker; Marc Blitzstein; Roman Bohnen; Phoebe Brand; Joseph Bromberg; Morris Carnovsky; Lee J. Cobb; Howard da Silva; Leif Erickson; Frances Farmer; John Garfield; Will Geer; Michael Gordon; Paul Green; Elia Kazan; Canada Lee; Robert Lewis; Eleanor Lynn; Karl Malden; Sanford Meisner; Charles Bickford; Harry Morgan; Ruth Nelson; Clifford Odets; John Randolph; Don Richardson; Martin Ritt; Irwin Shaw; Anna Sokolow; Paul Strand; Franchot Tone

The Group Theatre was a theater collective based in New York City and formed in 1931 by Harold Clurman, Cheryl Crawford and Lee Strasberg. It was intended as a base for the kind of theatre they and their colleagues believed in—a forceful, naturalistic and highly disciplined artistry. They were pioneers of what would become an "American acting technique", derived from the teachings of Konstantin Stanislavski, but pushed beyond them as well. The company included actors, directors, playwrights, and producers. The name "Group" came from the idea of the actors as a pure ensemble; a reference to the company as "our group" led them to "accept the inevitable and call their company The Group Theatre."

The New York–based Group Theatre had no connection with the identically named Group Theatre based in London and founded in 1932.

In the ten years of its existence, the Group Theatre produced works by many important American playwrights, including Clifford Odets, Sidney Kingsley, Paul Green, Robert Ardrey, and Irwin Shaw. Its most notable productions included Success Story starring Stella Adler and Luther Adler, Clifford Odets' Awake and Sing, Waiting for Lefty, Paradise Lost, and the 1937–38 Broadway hit Golden Boy, starring Luther Adler and Frances Farmer.

The Group Theatre included Harold Clurman, Lee Strasberg, Cheryl Crawford, Stella Adler (a founding member), Morris Carnovsky, Clifford Odets, Sanford Meisner, Elia Kazan, Harry Morgan (billed as Harry Bratsburg), Robert Lewis, John Garfield (billed as Jules Garfield), Rita Hassan, Canada Lee, Franchot Tone, Frances Farmer, Phoebe Brand, Ruth Nelson, Will Geer, Howard da Silva, Sidney Lumet, Charles Bickford, John Randolph, Joseph Bromberg, Michael Gordon, Paul Green, Marc Blitzstein, Paul Strand, Anna Sokolow, Lee J. Cobb, Roman Bohnen, Jay Adler, Luther Adler, Robert Ardrey, Don Richardson, and many others.

== History ==
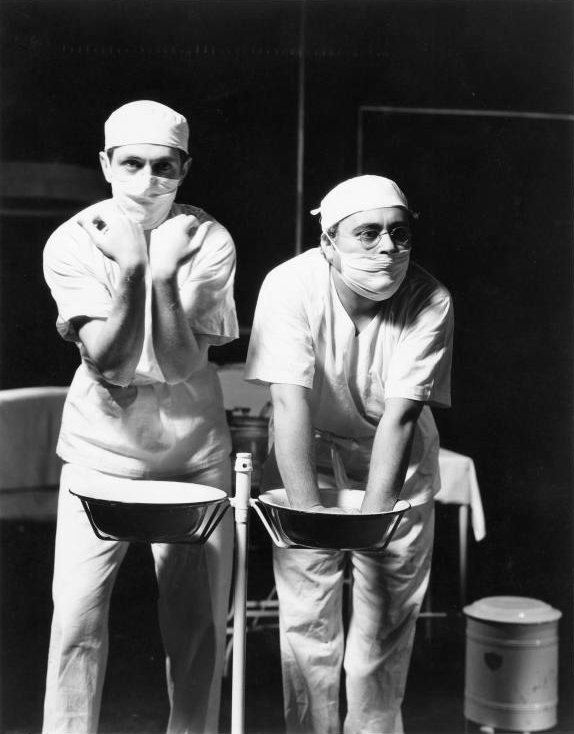
Men in White (1933), winner of the Pulitzer Prize

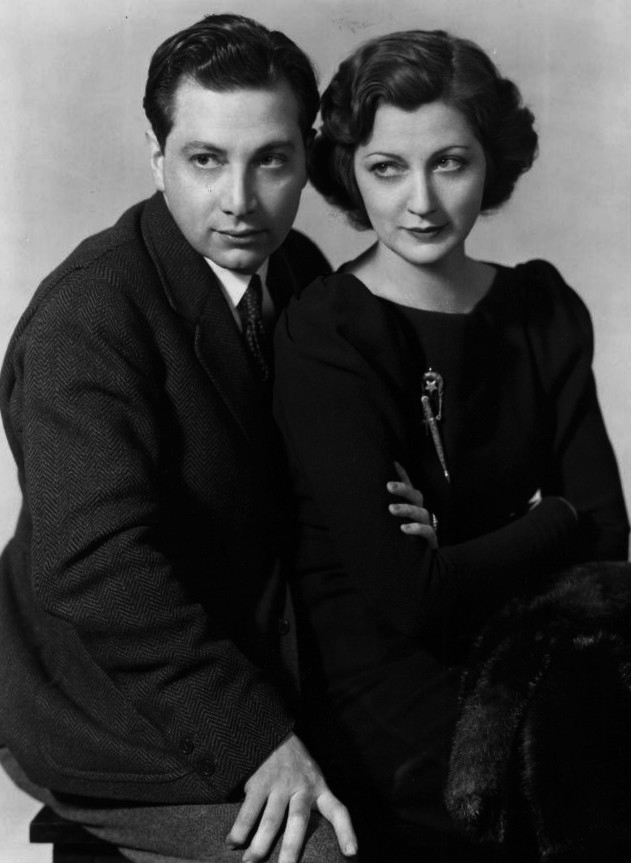
Luther Adler and Stella Adler in Awake and Sing! (1935)

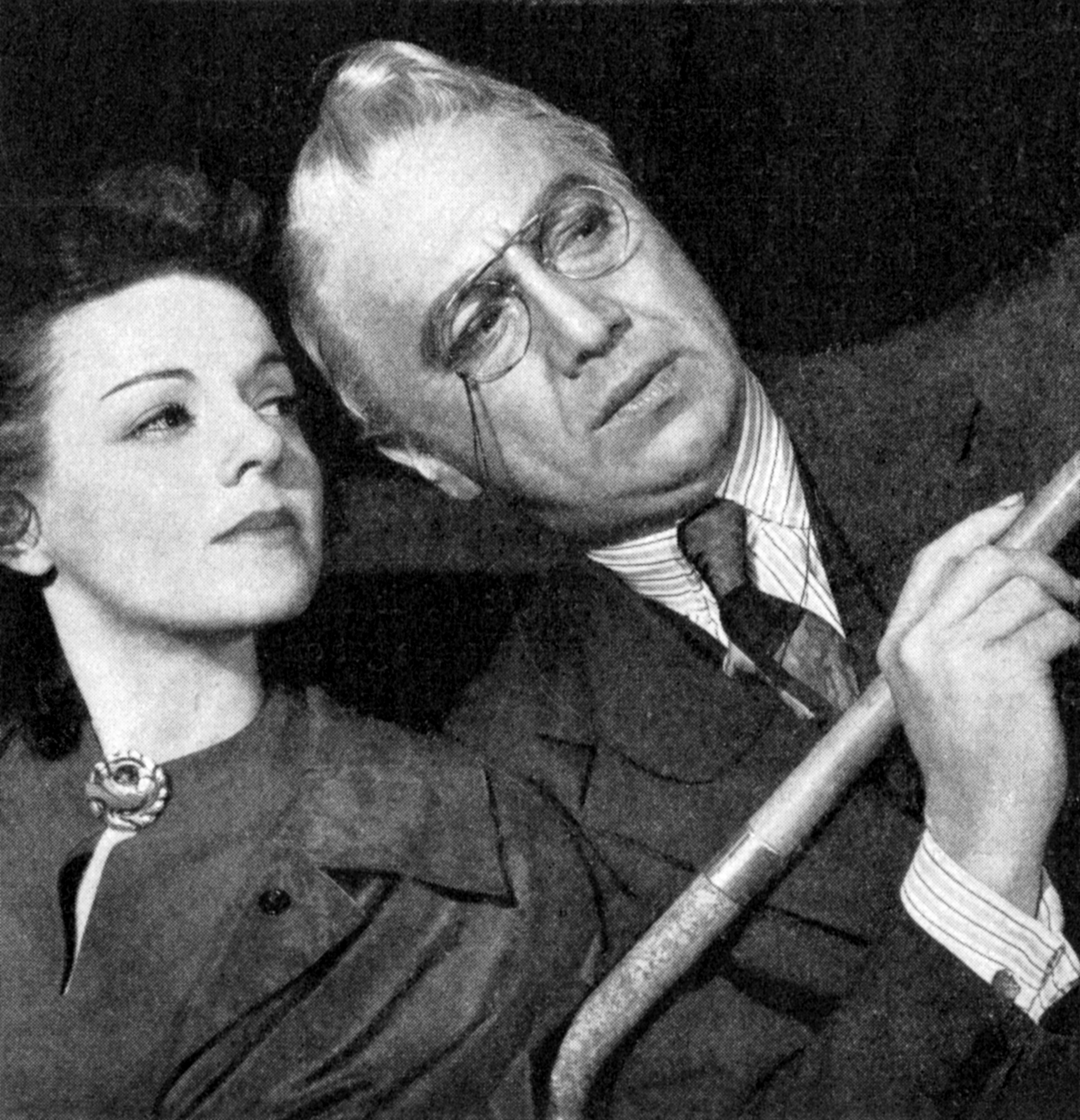
Eleanor Lynn and Luther Adler in Rocket to the Moon (1938)

The Group Theatre's first production was Paul Green's The House of Connelly on September 23, 1931, at the Martin Beck Theatre. The company asked the Theatre Guild to help cover the $5,000 cost to perform. The Theatre Guild offered to pay the full amount if the group "removed Mary Morris and Morris Carnovsky from the cast and restored the tragic ending" from the more upbeat and hopeful rewrite Green produced. The group refused and instead raised half on its own, receiving support from Eugene O'Neill. The play was an immediate critical success and was recognized for the special ensemble performances which the group would develop.

The group's production of John Howard Lawson's Success Story, which chronicled the rise of a youthful idealist who sacrifices his principles as he rises to the top of the advertising business, received very mixed reviews, with Luther Adler and Stella Adler receiving the majority of the positive reviews.

The group took on novelist Dawn Powell's dark comedy Big Night, rehearsed it for six months and asked for extensive revisions from the playwright. The result was a critical and box-office disaster that ran a scant nine performances. Harold Clurman, who took over the production late in the rehearsal period, later admitted the group's role in the fiasco. "The play should have been done in four swift weeks—or not at all. We worried it and harried our actors with it for months."

Later, during the first full season (1933–34), Men in White, written by Sidney Kingsley, directed by Lee Strasberg and produced by Sidney Harmon, became a financial success for the group. It won the Pulitzer Prize for Drama.

On the night of January 5, 1935, some members of the group participated in a benefit performance for the New Theatre Magazine. Written by Clifford Odets and directed by Odets and Sanford Meisner, the one-act play Waiting for Lefty was performed at the Civic Repertory Theatre in New York City and became a theatrical legend. The play reflects a kind of street poetry that brought great acclaim to the group and to Odets as the new voice of social drama in the 1930s. Odets became the playwright most strongly identified with the group, and its productions of Awake and Sing! and Paradise Lost, both directed in 1935 by Harold Clurman, proved to be excellent vehicles for the Stanislavskian aesthetic. The following year, the group produced the Paul Green-Kurt Weill anti-war musical Johnny Johnson, directed by Strasberg.

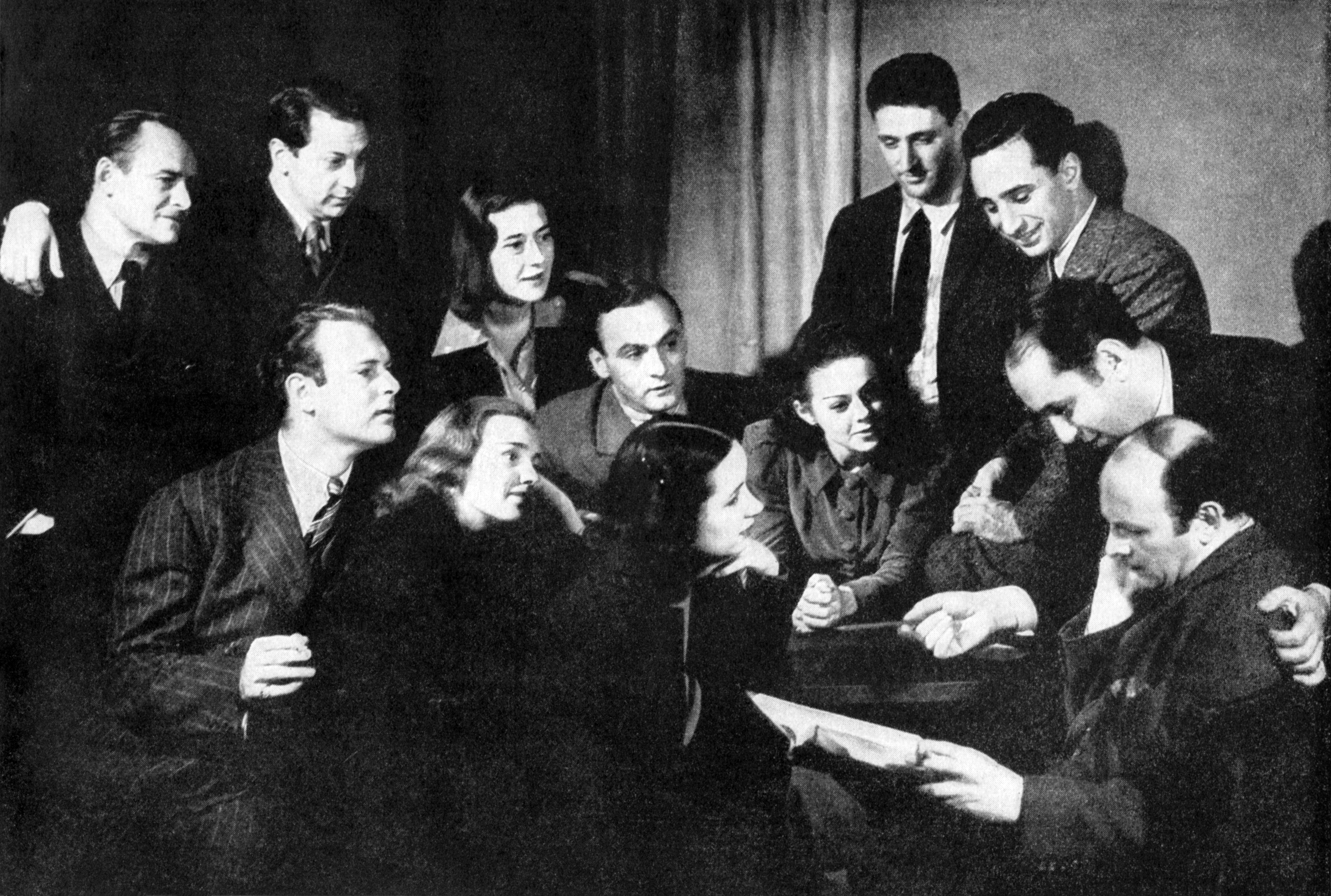
Some members of the Group Theatre in 1938: Roman Bohnen, Luther Adler, Leif Erickson, Frances Farmer, Ruth Nelson, Sanford Meisner, Phoebe Brand, Eleanor Lynn, Irwin Shaw, Elia Kazan, Harold Clurman and Morris Carnovsky

The Group Theatre's most successful production was the 1937–38 Broadway hit Golden Boy.

Elia Kazan directed Robert Ardrey's plays Casey Jones and Thunder Rock in 1938 and 1939–40 for the Group Theatre.

The group gathered at different summer locations to rehearse and train intensively for six of its 10 years in existence. The group spent the summer of 1931 at Brookfield Center, 1936 at Pine Brook Country Club, located near Nichols, Connecticut. Other summer venues included Brookfield Center, Connecticut (1931); Dover Furnace in Dutchess County, New York (1932); Green Mansions in Warrensburg, New York in 1933; a large house in Ellenville, New York (1934); and Lake Grove in Smithtown, New York in 1939.

Despite its success and sweeping impact on the American theater landscape for many years to come, the group ended by 1941, and factors included the impending war, the lure of fame and fortune in Hollywood, the lack of institutional funding, and the friction of interpersonal relationships.

== Broadway productions ==
Date	Title	Author	Notes
September 28 – December 1931	The House of Connelly	Paul Green	Martin Beck Theatre; Directed by Lee Strasberg and Cheryl Crawford
December 10–?, 1931	1931—	Claire and Paul Sifton	Mansfield Theatre; Directed by Lee Strasberg
March 9–?, 1932	Night Over Taos	Maxwell Anderson	48th Street Theatre; Directed by Lee Strasberg
September 26, 1932 – January 1933	Success Story	John Howard Lawson	Maxine Elliott Theatre; Directed by Lee Strasberg
January 17–?, 1933	Big Night	Dawn Powell	Maxine Elliott Theatre; Directed by Cheryl Crawford
September 26, 1933 – July 1934	Men in White	Sidney Kingsley	Broadhurst Theatre; Directed by Lee Strasberg
March 22 – April 1934	Gentlewoman	John Howard Lawson	Cort Theatre; Directed by Lee Strasberg
November 28, 1934 – January 1935	Gold Eagle Guy	Melvin Levy	Morosco Theatre; Directed by Lee Strasberg
February 19 – July 27, 1935	Awake and Sing!	Clifford Odets	Belasco Theatre; Directed by Harold Clurman
March 26 – July 1935	Waiting for Lefty	Clifford Odets	Longacre Theatre; Directed by Sanford Meisner and Clifford Odets
March 26 – July 1935	Till the Day I Die	Clifford Odets	Longacre Theatre; Directed by Cheryl Crawford
September 9–? 1935	Waiting for Lefty	Clifford Odets	Belasco Theatre; Directed by Sanford Meisner and Clifford Odets
September 9–? 1935	Awake and Sing!	Clifford Odets	Belasco Theatre; Directed by Harold Clurman
November 30 – December 1935	Weep for the Virgins	Nellise Child	46th Street Theatre; Directed by Cheryl Crawford
December 6, 1935 – February 1936	Paradise Lost	Clifford Odets	Longacre Theatre; Directed by Harold Clurman
March 13–?, 1936	The Case of Clyde Griffiths	Erwin Piscator and Lena Goldschmidt	Ethel Barrymore Theatre; Adapted from the novel An American Tragedy; Directed by Lee Strasberg
November 19, 1936 – January 16, 1937	Johnny Johnson	Paul Green	44th Street Theatre; Music by Kurt Weill; Directed by Lee Strasberg
November 4, 1937 – June 1938	Golden Boy	Clifford Odets	Belasco Theatre; Directed by Harold Clurman
February 19 – March 1938	Casey Jones	Robert Ardrey	Fulton Theatre; Directed by Elia Kazan
November 24, 1938 – March 1939	Rocket to the Moon	Clifford Odets	Belasco Theatre; Directed by Harold Clurman
January 5 – May 1939	The Gentle People	Irwin Shaw	Belasco Theatre; Directed by Harold Clurman
March 7 – April 1939	Awake and Sing!	Clifford Odets	Windsor Theatre; Directed by Harold Clurman
April 13 – May 1939	My Heart's in the Highlands	William Saroyan	Guild Theatre; Directed by Robert Lewis
November 14 – December 2, 1939	Thunder Rock	Robert Ardrey	Mansfield Theatre; Directed by Elia Kazan
February 22 – March 1940	Night Music	Clifford Odets	Broadhurst Theatre; Directed by Harold Clurman
December 17, 1940 – January 4, 1941	Retreat to Pleasure	Irwin Shaw	Belasco Theatre; Directed by Harold Clurman

== Influence ==
After the war, in 1947, Robert Lewis, Elia Kazan, and Cheryl Crawford founded the Actors Studio, where the techniques inspired by Stanislavski and developed in the Group Theatre were refined. Under the leadership of Lee Strasberg, who later joined the Actors Studio and became its director in 1951, what is now referred to as The Method emerged as a lasting force in modern drama.

Institutionally, the Group Theatre influenced the Chelsea Theater Center, a later theater in New York (1960s and 1970s), born of idealism and destroyed by lack of funding and friction between its co-directors. Harold Prince invokes the group in his foreword to the book Chelsea on the Edge: The Adventures of an American Theater.

== House Un-American Activities Committee (HUAC) ==
In the 1950s, many of the former members were called before the House Un-American Activities Committee (HUAC). Those who appeared as friendly witnesses, such as Elia Kazan, Clifford Odets, and Lee J. Cobb, avoided the fate of their colleagues who refused to name Communist Party members and, as a result, were blacklisted. Elia Kazan would later state he abandoned his Communist views in part because of an agenda to transform the Group Theatre into a company devoted to promoting "Marxist ideology." Odets would share similar concerns after experiencing pressure from the party to change the direction of his writing.

Mark Kemble's play Names covers the relationship between HUAC and the former members of the Group Theatre.
