= Ruth Nelson (actress) =

American actress

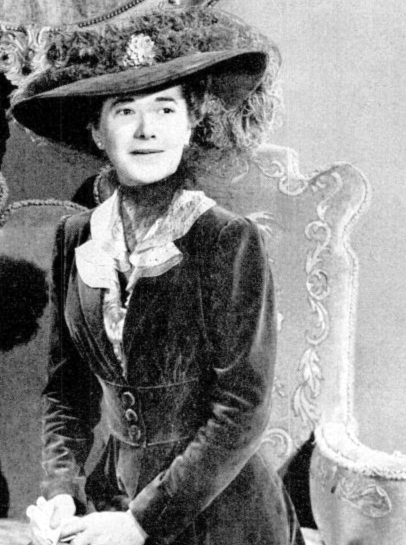
- Promotional photograph for the film Wilson (1944)
- Born: Ruth Gloria Nelson; August 2, 1905; Saginaw, Michigan, U.S.
- Died: September 12, 1992 (aged 87); New York City, U.S.
- Occupation: Actress
- Years active: 1928–1991
- Spouses: William Challee (m. 1931; div. 1937); John Cromwell (m. 1947; died 1979)

Ruth Gloria Nelson (August 2, 1905 – September 12, 1992) was an American stage and film actress. She is known for her roles in films such as Wilson, A Tree Grows in Brooklyn, Humoresque, 3 Women, The Late Show and Awakenings. She was the fourth wife of John Cromwell, with whom she acted on multiple occasions.

== Early life ==
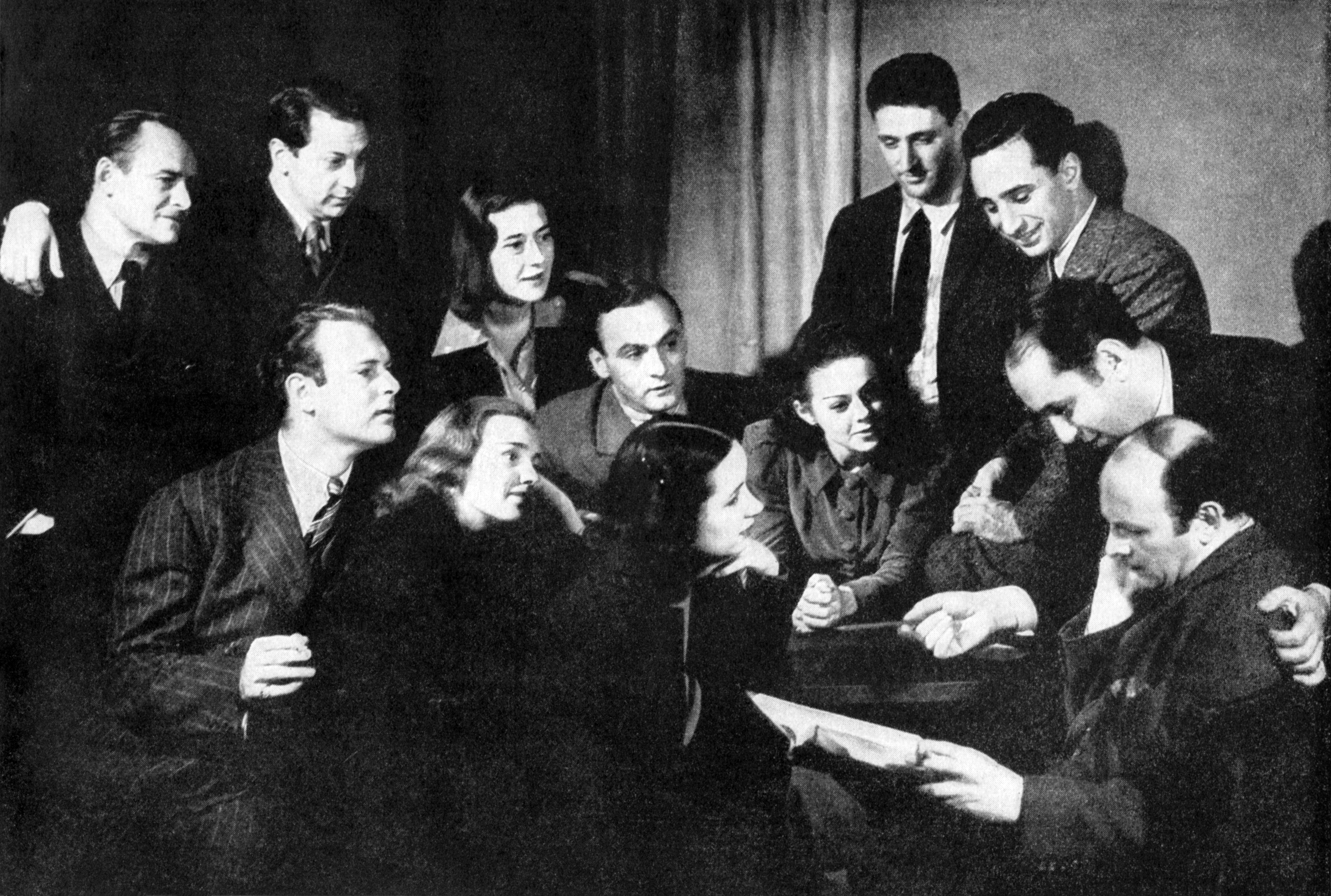
Ruth Nelson (back row, third from left) with members of the Group Theatre in 1938

Born in Saginaw, Michigan, Nelson was the daughter of Sanford Leroy Nelson and vaudeville actress Eva Mudge. She attended Immaculate Heart Convent School in Los Angeles, studying first with Daniel Frohman and then with Richard Boleslawski at the American Laboratory Theatre in New York City during the early 1920s.

== Career ==
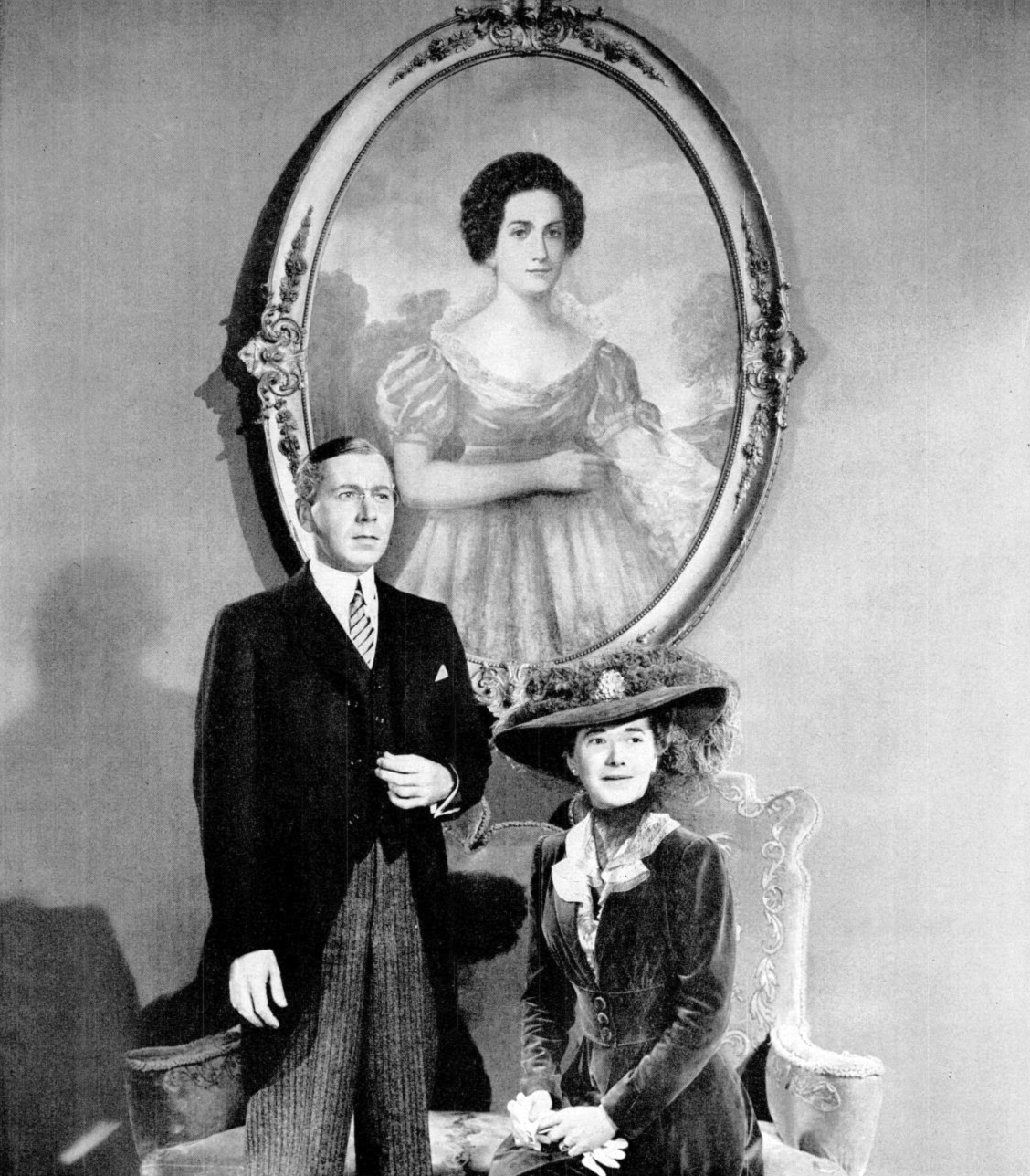
Ruth Nelson as First Lady Ellen Axson Wilson in Wilson (1944)

Nelson made her stage debut in New York on April 4, 1928, at the Laboratory Theatre under Boleslawski's direction, portraying the title character in Jean-Jacques Bernard's Martine. Over the next two seasons, Nelson made two more appearances—in Checkhov's The Seagull and Vladimir Kirshon's Red Rust—prior to becoming, in 1931, a charter member of the newly formed theatre collective, The Group Theatre, with whom she remained throughout its run from 1931 to 1941, receiving particular praise for her performance as the chief striker's wife in Clifford Odets' play, Waiting for Lefty.

After the Group Theatre ended in 1941, Nelson relocated to Hollywood. Throughout the 1940s, she made a number of movies for 20th Century Fox and other Hollywood studios. One of these was A Tree Grows in Brooklyn (1945), directed by fellow Group Theatre member Elia Kazan. She also appeared in Kazan's film The Sea of Grass in 1947.

As her career began to take off, she was compelled to put things on hold when her husband, the director John Cromwell, a leading Roosevelt Democrat in the film industry, was falsely accused of Communism by actor Adolphe Menjou in front of the House Un-American Activities Committee hearings on Hollywood in 1951 and his career went on to be blacklisted. While offered a New York stage role as a wife in what turned out to be Death of a Salesman, Nelson turned it down as she did most acting offers at this time to stay in Los Angeles and support Cromwell.

Nelson had not made a Hollywood film for nearly 30 years when she appeared with her husband in 1977's 3 Women, directed by Robert Altman, and The Late Show, a film Robert Benton wrote and directed that Altman produced. The following year, she played Aunt Beatrice Sloan Cory and Cromwell portrayed the befuddled Bishop Martin in A Wedding, a comedy directed by Altman.

In 1980, stepson James Cromwell appeared with Nelson in John Korty's made-for-TV movie A Christmas Without Snow; two years later, they appeared onstage together in the Public Theater's production of Botho Strauss's Three Acts of Recognition, staged by Richard Foreman. Moreover, as early as 1968, Nelson had performed onstage under her stepson's direction, giving a well-received performance as Mary Tyrone in a regional production of O'Neill's Long Day's Journey Into Night; reprising the role she'd first played on Broadway in 1957, initially as Florence Eldridge's understudy, and then as the permanent replacement for an ailing Fay Bainter during the show's national tour. Both critic Claudia Cassidy and director—and Group Theatre co-founder—Robert Lewis judged Nelson's Mary Tyrone the finest they'd ever seen.

Reviewing the 1966 revival of Thornton Wilder's The Skin of Our Teeth staged by Douglas Campbell at Minnesota's Guthrie Theatre, critic Stanley Kauffmann writes:

He [Campbell] has helped Ruth Nelson to a performance of Mrs. Antrobus that is very easily the best of the three I have seen (two of them on Broadway). (Note: Presumably, the performances to which Nelson's is being compared—that is, those seen in the only two productions staged on Broadway prior to this 1966 revival—are those by Florence Eldridge in the original 1942 production and Helen Hayes in 1955.) She is matriarchal without being maudlin, and (which is as rare in art as in life) she reveals a human being under the Mother. Miss Nelson misses no nuance or reality that the part offers, and in one moment—when she mourns her murdered son—she touches true elegy.

Nelson's final feature film appearance was in 1990's Awakenings; her performance—as the mother of a hospital patient played by Robert De Niro (a role which—in a widely disseminated contemporaneous story published by Premiere Magazine—was erroneously reported as having gone to an Oscar-flaunting Shelley Winters)—was singled out for praise by several critics, including the Wall Street Journal's Julie Salamon: "Nelson achieves a wrenching beauty that stands out even among these exceptional actors doing exceptional things." In her 2012 memoir, the film's director, Penny Marshall, recalls:

Ruth was a great lady. She was a New York stage actress in the 1930s who transitioned to movies but was blacklisted in the 1950s when her second husband was among those Senator Joseph McCarthy labeled a Communist. She was victimized by association and didn't work for three decades. When I met her, she was eighty-four and had battled a brain tumor and also had arthritis. I stared at her slender arms and gnarled hands. It looked like she had pushed her kid's arms and legs down for years. I liked her. I couldn't get her insured, but I didn't care. Neither did she. She wanted to do it. To me, that’s what the movie was about.

== Personal life ==
Nelson was married twice. She wed actor William Challee on August 2, 1931. They divorced in 1937. In 1947, Nelson married actor/director John Cromwell, whom she had first met two years before on the set of Anna and the King of Siam. The marriage lasted 32 years until Cromwell's death in 1979 from a pulmonary embolism.

She was the stepmother of actor James Cromwell.

== Death ==
Nelson died on September 12, 1992, at her home in New York City from brain cancer complicated by a stroke and pneumonia.

== Filmography ==
=== Film ===
Year	Title	Role	Notes
1943	The North Star	Nadya Simonov	
1944	None Shall Escape	Alice Grimm	
1944	The Eve of St. Mark	Nell West	
1944	Wilson	Ellen Wilson	
1944	The Keys of the Kingdom	Lisbeth Chisholm	
1945	A Tree Grows in Brooklyn	Miss McDonough	
1945	The Girl of the Limberlost	Kate Comstock	
1946	Shock	Mrs. Margaret Cross	Uncredited
1946	Sentimental Journey	Mrs. McMasters	
1946	Anna and the King of Siam	Unknown	Uncredited
1946	Till the End of Time	Amy Harper	
1946	Humoresque	Esther Boray	
1947	The Sea of Grass	Selina Hall, Sam Hall's Wife	
1947	Mother Wore Tights	Miss Ridgeway	
1948	Arch of Triumph	Madame Fessier	
1977	The Late Show	Mrs. Schmidt	
1977	3 Women	Mrs. Rose	
1978	A Wedding	Aunt Beatrice Sloan Cory	
1989	Sea of Love	Woman on the street	
1990	Awakenings	Mrs. Lowe	

=== Television ===
Year	Title	Role	Notes
1979	Visions	Amelia	"Ladies in Waiting"
1980	Ryan's Hope	Mrs. Merck	"1.1322"
1980	A Christmas Without Snow	Inez	TV film
1981	Hart to Hart	Ida Cox	"Blue Chip Murder"
1981	Skokie	Grandma Jannsen	TV film
1983	The Haunting Passion	Judith Granville	TV film
1991	Lethal Innocence	Bernice	TV film
