= Harold Clurman =

American theatre director and critic (1901–1980)

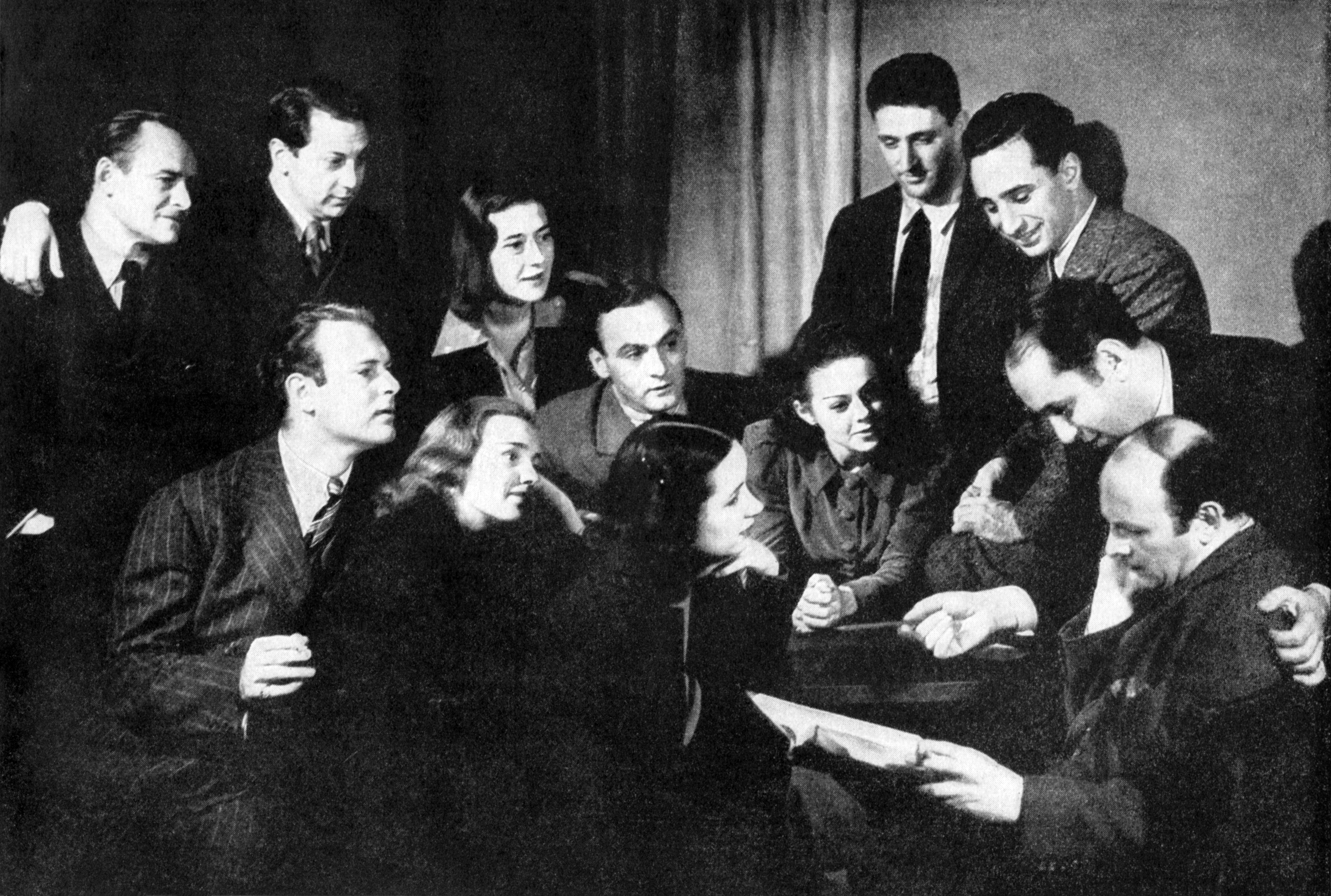
- Some members of the Group Theatre in 1938 (left to right): Roman Bohnen, Luther Adler, Leif Erickson, Frances Farmer, Ruth Nelson, Sanford Meisner, Phoebe Brand, Eleanor Lynn, Irwin Shaw, Elia Kazan, Harold Clurman and Morris Carnovsky
- Born: September 18, 1901; New York City, U.S.
- Died: September 9, 1980 (aged 78)
- Occupations: Theatre director, critic, film writer and director
- Years active: 1924–1980

Harold Edgar Clurman (September 18, 1901 – September 9, 1980) was an American theatre director and drama critic. In 2003, he was named one of the most influential figures in U.S. theater by PBS. He was one of the three founders of New York City's Group Theatre (1931–1941). He directed more than 40 plays in his career and, during the 1950s, was nominated for a Tony Award as director for several productions. In addition to his directing career, he was drama critic for The New Republic (1948–1952) and The Nation (1953–1980), helping shape American theater by writing about it. Clurman wrote seven books about the theatre, including his memoir The Fervent Years: The Group Theatre and the Thirties (1961).

== Early life and education ==
Clurman was born on the Lower East Side of New York City to Jewish parents from Kamenets Podolsky in the Russian Empire (present-day Ukraine): Samuel, a doctor, and Bertha Clurman. He had three older brothers, Morris, Albert, and William. His parents took him at age six to Yiddish theater, and Jacob Adler's performances in Yiddish translations of Karl Gutzkow's Uriel Acosta and Gotthold Ephraim Lessing's Nathan the Wise fascinated him, although he did not understand Yiddish.

He attended Columbia and, at the age of 20, moved to France to study at the University of Paris. There he shared an apartment with the young composer Aaron Copland. In Paris, he saw all sorts of theatrical productions. He was influenced especially by the work of Jacques Copeau and the Moscow Art Theatre, whose permanent company built a strong creative force. He wrote his thesis on the history of French drama from 1890 to 1914.

Clurman returned to New York in 1924 and started working as an extra in plays, despite his lack of experience. He became a stage manager and play reader for the Theatre Guild. He briefly studied Stanislavski's system under the tutelage of Richard Boleslavsky, and became Jacques Copeau's translator/assistant on his production of The Brothers Karamazov, based on the novel by the Russian writer Fyodor Dostoevsky.

== Career ==
Clurman began work as an actor in New York. He felt that the standard American theater, though successful at the box office, was not culturally significant. He said, "I was interested in what the theater was going to say [...]. The theater must say something. It must relate to society. It must relate to the world we live in."

Together with the like-minded Cheryl Crawford and Lee Strasberg, he began to create what would become the Group Theatre. In November 1930, Clurman led weekly lectures, in which they talked about founding a permanent theatrical company to produce plays dealing with important modern social issues. Together with 28 other young people, they formed a group that developed a groundbreaking style of theater that strongly influenced American productions, including such elements as Stanislavski-trained actors, realism based on American stories, and political content. By building a permanent company, they expected to increase the synergy and trust among the members, who included Stella Adler, Morris Carnovsky, Phoebe Brand, Elia Kazan, Clifford Odets, and Sanford Meisner.

In the summer of 1931, the first members of the Group Theatre rehearsed for several weeks in the countryside of Nichols, Connecticut, at the Pine Brook Country Club. They were preparing The House of Connelly by Paul Green, their first production, directed by Strasberg. Clurman was the scholar of the group — he knew multiple languages, read widely, and listened to a broad array of music. Strasberg dealt with acting and directing, and Crawford dealt with the business.

The first play which Clurman directed for the Group Theatre was Awake and Sing! by Clifford Odets in 1935. The play's success led Clurman to develop his directing style. He believed that all the elements of a play—text, acting, lighting, scenery and direction—needed to work together to convey a unified message. Clurman would read the script over and over, each time focusing on a different element or character. He tried to inspire, guide and constructively critique his designers rather than dictate to them. He also used Richard Boleslavsky's technique of identifying the "spine," or main action, of each character, then using those to determine the spine of the play. He encouraged his actors to find "active verbs" to describe what their characters were trying to accomplish.

In 1937, tensions among Clurman, Crawford and Strasberg caused the latter two to resign from the Group; four years later, the Group Theatre permanently disbanded. Clurman went on to direct plays on Broadway, more than 40 in all, and write as a newspaper theatre critic.

== Marriage and family ==
In 1943 Clurman married Stella Adler, a charismatic theatre actress and later a renowned New York acting coach. A member of the Group Theatre since its founding, Adler was the daughter of the notable Yiddish actor Jacob Adler. Clurman was her second husband. They divorced in 1960. Clurman's second marriage was to the independent filmmaker Juleen Compton.

== Director and drama critic ==
Clurman had an active career as a director, over the decades leading more than 40 productions, and helping bring many new works to the stage. He is considered "one of the most influential theater directors in America".

In addition, Clurman helped shape American theater by writing about it, as drama critic for The New Republic (1948–1952), The Nation (1953–1980), and New York (1968). He encouraged new styles of production, such as that of the Living Theater, and championed contemporary plays and playwrights.

== Author ==
He wrote a memoir about the Group Theatre's beginning and their making art within American culture, called The Fervent Years: The Group Theatre and the Thirties. His six other books about the theater include On Directing (1972); his autobiography, All People are Famous (1974); The Divine Pastime (1974); Ibsen (1977); and Nine Plays of the Modern Theater (1981). Most of his essays and reviews can be found in The Collected Works of Harold Clurman.

== On acting ==
Uta Hagen in Respect for Acting credits Clurman with a new perspective on acting. She summarized his approach as demanding the human being within the character:

In 1947, I worked in a play under the direction of Harold Clurman. He opened a new world in the professional theatre for me. He took away my 'tricks.' He imposed no line readings, no gestures, no positions on the actors. At first I floundered badly because for many years I had become accustomed to using specific outer directions as the material from which to construct the mask for my character, the mask behind which I would hide throughout the performance. Mr. Clurman refused to accept a mask. He demanded ME in the role. My love of acting was slowly reawakened as I began to deal with a strange new technique of evolving in the character. I was not allowed to begin with, or concern myself at any time with, a preconceived form. I was assured that a form would result from the work we were doing.

Clurman died a week before what would have been his 79th birthday, on September 9, 1980, in New York City of cancer. He is buried in Mt. Carmel Cemetery, Glendale, Queens.

== Works on Broadway ==
Note: All works are plays and are the original productions unless otherwise noted.

- Caesar and Cleopatra (1925) (revival) - actor
- The Goat Song (1926) - actor
- The Chief Thing (1926) - actor
- Juarez and Maximilian (1926) - actor
- Night Over Taos (1932) - produced by the Group Theater
- Big Night (1933) - produced by the Group Theater
- Men in White (1934) - produced by the Group Theater
- Awake and Sing! (1935) - director, produced by the Group Theater
- Waiting for Lefty (1935) - produced by the Group Theater
- Till the Day I Die (1935) - produced by the Group Theater
- Weep for the Virgins (1935) - produced by the Group Theater
- Paradise Lost (1935) - director, produced by the Group Theater
- Case of Clyde Griffiths (1936) - co-produced by the Group Theater
- Johnny Johnson (1936) - produced by the Group Theater
- Golden Boy (1937) - director, produced by the Group Theater
- Casey Jones (1938) - produced by the Group Theater
- Rocket to the Moon (1938) - director, produced by the Group Theater
- The Gentle People (1939) - director, produced by the Group Theater
- Awake and Sing! (1939) (revival) - director, produced by the Group Theater
- My Heart's in the Highlands (1939) - produced by the Group Theater
- Thunder Rock (1939) - produced by the Group Theater
- Night Music (1940) - director, produced by the Group Theater
- Retreat to Pleasure (1940) - director
- The Russian People (1942) - director
- Deadline at Dawn (1945) - movie, director
- Beggars Are Coming to Town (1945) - director
- Truckline Cafe (1946) - director and co-producer
- All My Sons (1947) - co-producer
- The Whole World Over (1947) - director
- The Young and Fair (1948) - director
- The Member of the Wedding (1950) - director
- The Bird Cage (1950) - director
- The Autumn Garden (1951) - director
- Desire Under the Elms (1952) (revival) - director
- The Time of the Cuckoo (1953) - director
- The Emperor's Clothes (1953) - director
- The Ladies of the Corridor (1953) - director
- Mademoiselle Colombe (1954) - director
- Bus Stop (1955) - director, Tony nomination for Best Director
- Tiger at the Gates (1955) - director, Tony nomination for Best Director
- Pipe Dream (1955) - director, Tony nomination for Best Director
- The Waltz of the Toreadors (1957) - director, Tony nomination for Best Director
- Orpheus Descending (1957) - director
- The Day the Money Stopped (1958) - director
- The Waltz of the Toreadors (1958) (revival) - director
- A Touch of the Poet (1958) - director
- The Cold Wind And The Warm (1958) - director
- Heartbreak House (1959) (revival) - director
- A Shot in the Dark (1961) - director
- After the Fall, The Changeling, Incident at Vichy - director, and Tartuffe (all played in repertory) (1964–1965) - executive consultant to the producer, Repertory Theater of Lincoln Center
- Where's Daddy? (1966) - director

== Legacy and honors ==
Clurman's legacy is his contribution to the creation of a uniquely American theater. The Harold Clurman Theatre, within the Off-Broadway Theatre Row Building complex, was named for him; it has since been renamed Theatre Five, after all theatres in the complex were renamed in a numbered format. Ronald Rand brought Harold Clurman to life in his acclaimed solo play, LET IT BE ART!, which has been performed for 22 years in 26 countries, 20 U.S. states, and at the Theatre Olympics in New Delhi and Kerala. Harold Clurman was awarded the Republic of France's Legion d'Honneur.

The Stella Adler and Harold Clurman Collection came to the Harry Ransom Center at the University of Texas at Austin in 2003. The collection includes original and reproduced materials gathered by Marjorie Loggia. Of particular interest are a handwritten draft of The Fervent Years, a photocopy typescript of "Plans for a First Studio," handwritten and typescript drafts of Lies Like Truth, and an edited typescript of Reminiscences: An Oral History. Among other noteworthy Clurman material are his correspondence (with Stella Adler and others), contracts and royalties, a diary, and theater programs he collected from 1926 to 1930.

Clurman is a character in Names, Mark Kemble's play about former Group Theatre members' struggles with the House Un-American Activities Committee.
