= Robert Lewis (director) =

American actor and director (1909-1997)

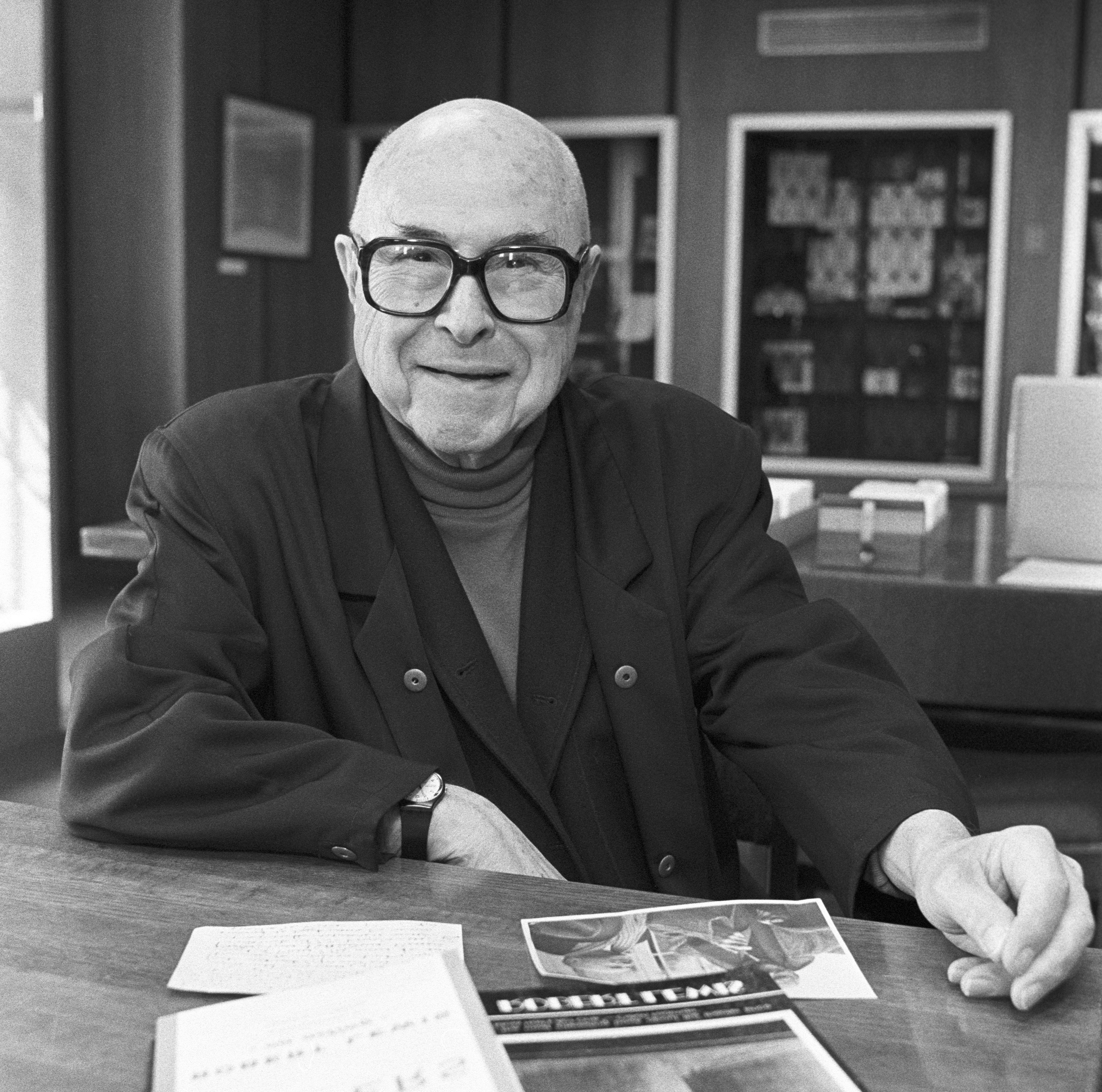
- Lewis at Kent State University in 1990
- Born: March 16, 1909; Brooklyn, New York, United States
- Died: November 23, 1997 (aged 88); New York, New York, United States
- Occupations: actor; director; author; drama/acting teacher; studio co-founder
- Years active: 1931–1997

Robert Lewis (March 16, 1909 – November 23, 1997) was an American actor, director, teacher, author and founder of the influential Actors Studio in New York in 1947.

In addition to his accomplishments on Broadway and in Hollywood, Lewis' greatest and longest lasting contribution to American theater may be the role he played as one of the foremost acting and directing teachers of his day. He was an early proponent of the Stanislavski System of acting technique and a founding member of New York's revolutionary Group Theatre in the 1930s. In the 1970s, he was the Head of the Yale School of Drama Acting and Directing Departments.

== Early years ==
Robert (Bobby) Lewis was born in Brooklyn in 1909 to a middle-class working family. Encouraged in the arts by his mother, a former contralto, Lewis acquired an early and lifelong interest in music, particularly opera. He studied cello and piano as a child but these eventually gave way to his love of acting. In 1929, he joined Eva Le Gallienne's Civic Repertory Theatre in New York City. His musical background proved invaluable later when he became a director of operas and filmed musicals in Hollywood.

== The Group Theatre ==
In 1931, Lewis became one of the 28 original members of New York's revolutionary Group Theatre. Formed by Harold Clurman, Lee Strasberg and producer Cheryl Crawford, The Group was an ensemble of passionate young actors, directors and writers who came together to explore the inner processes of theatre craft.

Lewis and other members of the Group, such as Stella Adler and Elia Kazan, were proponents of a new form of acting based on the techniques of Russian director Constantin Stanislavski. They believed the Stanislavski System, first taught in America in the 1920s by former members of the Moscow Art Theatre, Richard Boleslavski and Maria Ouspenskaya at the American Laboratory Theatre where Clurman and Strasberg had studied, resulted in a more truthful, more believable, and therefore more powerful stage performance than could be accomplished with more seemingly external techniques common at that time.

Lewis appeared in several original Group Theatre productions in the 1930s including Sidney Kingsley's Pulitzer Prize-winning Men in White and Clifford Odets' plays Waiting for Lefty, Awake and Sing!, Paradise Lost and Golden Boy.

Lewis summered at Pine Brook Country Club in Nichols, Connecticut. Pinebrook is best known for becoming the summer home of the Group Theatre (New York). Some of the other artists who summered there were; Elia Kazan, Harry Morgan, John Garfield, Lee J. Cobb, Will Geer, Clifford Odets, Howard Da Silva and Irwin Shaw.

As in any artistic endeavor, differences in translation and emphasis between the Russian Stanislavski System, and what eventually came to be known as The Method, were debated vigorously in the Group. In the summer of 1934, Stella Adler returned from a trip to Paris where she had worked privately with Stanislavski and directly challenged Lee Strasberg's approach, deepening tensions which led to Strasberg's departure from the Group in 1937. In later years, Lewis held that Strasberg's Method, while valid in its particulars, was a misrepresentation of Stanislavski because it emphasized only some parts of Stanislavski's theory. (See Method — Or Madness?, below)

Despite the Group's success, internal disagreements, the lure of Hollywood and financial issues began to take a toll and, by late 1936, production was suspended. Officially released from Group obligations, many of the members, including Lewis and Group founder Harold Clurman, went off to join other Group members already in Hollywood.

In April 1937, Lee Strasberg and Cheryl Crawford resigned as directors of the Group. A year later, however, Robert Lewis and Elia Kazan returned to New York to restart Group workshops and The Group Theatre Studio resumed with fifty actors chosen from four hundred who auditioned. Lewis, Kazan and Sanford Meisner were the principal teachers.

That same year, Harold Clurman returned from Hollywood to stage the Group's production of Clifford Odets' Golden Boy, which became its most successful play. Robert Lewis was cast as Roxy Gottlieb, the prizefight promoter. Lewis later maintained that he had been miscast in the original production, though he assumed a more satisfying role as director of his own successful production of Golden Boy at the St. James Theatre in London, in 1938.

While in London, Lewis studied with Michael Chekov, an actor whose work he admired and whom Stanislavski considered one of the foremost interpreters of his theories. At Chekov's studio in Devonshire at Dartington Hall, Lewis further shaped his understanding of Stanislavski's techniques, or "method", as it was informally known in America.

The following year, Lewis made his Broadway directorial debut with a critically successful production of William Saroyan's My Heart's in the Highlands (1939).

== Hollywood ==
As did other Group members like Franchot Tone, Clifford Odets, Stella Adler, Elia Kazan and Harold Clurman, Lewis found the "need to sin" in Hollywood (as Odets called it) irresistible.

In his book Slings and Arrows: Theater in My Life, Lewis complains that "being short and round", he reluctantly had to accept that, as an actor, he fell into the character, rather than the leading man category.

True enough, after moving to Los Angeles in 1940, he became known in Hollywood for his ability to transform himself into memorable screen characters, particularly characters of different nationalities. He played German officers, such as Colonel Pirosh in Paris After Dark (FOX, 1943), opposite George Sanders, and Sergeant Schmidt in Son of Lassie (MGM, 1945), starring Peter Lawford, Donald Crisp and June Lockhart. He became French collaborationist Maurice Bonnard in Tonight We Raid Calais (FOX, 1943), and the villainous Japanese Colonel Sato in Dragon Seed (MGM, 1944), starring Katharine Hepburn. A highlight of his Hollywood character actor career came when he played Frenchman Maurice Bottello opposite his friend Charles Chaplin in Chaplin's controversial film Monsieur Verdoux (1947).

Though he went on to perform in and co-direct (with Vincente Minnelli) musicals like Ziegfeld Follies (MGM, 1946), starring Fred Astaire, and he directed the 1956 version of Anything Goes (Paramount), starring Bing Crosby and Donald O'Connor, Lewis was strictly tied to a contract with MGM studios. Lewis reminisced he felt bored, underused and flustered in Hollywood; and struggled for some years to get out of his contract at MGM so he could return to Broadway and the East coast.

Robert Lewis did return to New York in 1947 to direct his first big commercial success on Broadway, Alan Jay Lerner and Frederick Loewe's whimsical musical play Brigadoon.

== The Actors Studio ==
In 1947, Lewis co-founded The Actors Studio, a professional actors' workshop, with former Group members, director Elia Kazan and producer Cheryl Crawford. The Actors Studio was an attempt to recapture the close ensemble nature of the Group, and to evolve and refine the methods first explored by the Group in the 1930s.

The first year, about fifty young actors were invited to join. Lewis taught classes for advanced members with emphasis on inner action or intention, while Kazan, who preferred to work with the younger actors, held forth on technique exercises such as sensory recall, imagination and improvisation.

In the first year alone, Robert Lewis' group, meeting three times a week, consisted of Marlon Brando, Montgomery Clift, Mildred Dunnock, Jerome Robbins, Herbert Berghof, Tom Ewell, John Forsythe, Kevin McCarthy, Karl Malden, E. G. Marshall, Patricia Neal, Eva Marie Saint, Beatrice Straight and David Wayne, to name a few.

Lewis eventually left The Actors Studio over differences with Kazan and Crawford involving the production of a play (later resolved) and a desire to concentrate on his burgeoning directorial career on Broadway. Indeed, 1947 saw the opening of his first big commercial Broadway hit, Alan Jay Lerner's Brigadoon.

Years after Lewis' departure, Lee Strasberg was asked to join the studio. Years later, Lewis differed with Strasberg over certain particulars of The Method – as did others. Despite any such differences, The Actors Studio flourished under Strasberg's leadership and he became artistic director several years later, a position he maintained until his death.

The Actors Studio, which is still active today, became one of the leading centers for the Stanislavski System, or Method, of dramatic training, producing some of the most influential performers in American theatre and film in the later half of the 20th century.

== Broadway ==
With the critical and commercial success of Brigadoon (1947), Robert Lewis began to cement himself as one of the Great White Way's most well-known directors.

Among the plays directed by Robert Lewis were: My Hearts in the Highlands (1939) by William Saroyan; Brigadoon (1947) by Alan Jay Lerner; Regina (1949); The Happy Time (1950); An Enemy of the People (1950); The Grass Harp (1952); The Teahouse of the August Moon (1953), winner of the Tony Award for Best Play and New York Drama Critics' Circle Award for Best Director; Witness for the Prosecution (1954) from Agatha Christie; Mister Johnson (1956); Jamaica (1957); The Hidden River (1957); Handful of Fire (1958); Chéri (1959); Kwamina (1961); Foxy (1964); Traveller Without Luggage (1964); On a Clear Day You Can See Forever (1965); and Harold and Maude (1980).

== Method — Or Madness? ==
By the 1950s, Stanislavski's ideas on acting technique had become very popular in America. In his memoirs, Lewis notes that widespread adoption had also fostered widespread confusion and misinformation, both among its defenders and its detractors. There were many different proponents and many different interpretations, some successful and some less so, all lumped together under the popular moniker of "The Method".

On the stage of the Playhouse Theatre in New York City, at 11:30 p.m. on the evening of Monday, April 15, 1957, Robert Lewis presented the first of eight lectures to professional actors, directors and playwrights on the subject of what, exactly, Method acting is and is not. There were some 5,000 written applications to attend the lectures.

In an attempt to clear the air surrounding Method acting, one of Lewis' points revolved around the idea that there are many facets of an actor's preparation and Stanislavski intended that the actor prepare internally and externally, rather than relying exclusively, or too heavily, upon internal techniques such as affective memory. Opponents of Method acting complained of a "generation of mumblers", whose acting conveyed the truth of the actor but not necessarily the truth of the character on the stage. Lewis felt that such performances were the result of an unfortunate misinterpretation of Stanislavski's ideas.

Lewis lamented throughout his career, in fact, that Method actors, who simply spoke stage dialogue truthfully, exactly as they would in life, were sometimes discouraged from playing Shakespeare or other classical writers because some people believed these authors' plays required a stylized method of speaking. In his lectures, Lewis maintained that by using their voices properly, Method actors could not only master formal ways of speaking, such as required for Shakespearean blank verse, but could create much more believable characters by doing so.

Indeed, one of Lewis's students, and one of the actors most often associated with the Method, Marlon Brando, received rave reviews and an Oscar nomination for his portrayal of Mark Antony in the MGM version of Julius Caesar opposite the acclaimed Shakespearean actor John Gielgud.

Lewis's lectures on Method acting later became the basis of his first book, Method — Or Madness? (Samuel French, 1958).

== Yale School of Drama ==
In addition to teaching at The Group Theatre, The Actors Studio, his own Robert Lewis Theatre Workshop and the Lincoln Center Training Program, Lewis was a popular lecturer at many colleges and universities throughout the country for the better part of his career. He returned to the Yale School of Drama often, for long and short stints, depending on his directing schedule, and eventually became Chairman of the Yale Acting and Directing departments in the 1970s under Dean Robert Brustein. During his tenure at Yale, Lewis helped shape the careers of many successful actors such as Meryl Streep. He retired from Yale in 1976.

== Later years ==
After Method — or Madness?, Robert Lewis wrote two other books on acting, Advice to the Players (Harper & Row, 1980), an actors handbook, and Slings and Arrows: Theater in My Life (Stein and Day, 1984), a memoir.

In 1978, in an ill-fated attempt to establish a professional repertory company in Westchester County, Lewis established the Robert Lewis Acting Company which was housed in the College of New Rochelle. Although Lewis was able to draw upon his vast roster of talent when casting, the effort only lasted one season. That season opened with the world premiere of “The Club Champion’s Widow” by John Ford Noonan. It featured Maureen Stapleton in the lead role. It was announced that Farley Granger would play the title role in the second production, “Caligula” (Camus, 1961), but he was replaced before opening. Peter Gallagher was Scipio and Julius LaRosa, famously fired on air by Arthur Godfrey, was cast as Helicon. The final play was a translation of a play by Alejandro Casona called, "Suicide Prohibited in Springtime" (Madrid, 1937). Directed by one of Bobby's Yale school students, David Rotenberg, it featured Earle Hyman, Lenka Peterson (one of the first actors admitted to the Actors’ Studio), Michael Lipton and Brenda Lewis. Meryl Streep, one of Bobby's students from Yale, had been in discussions with Lewis about doing “The Taming of the Shrew” which was to be directed by Charles Marowitz. Unfortunately, there wasn't a second season. Lewis remained active in theater in the 1980s and continued to teach a new generation of actors and directors through his Robert Lewis Theatre Workshop and at Rice University in 1981–82. He also served as the first artistic director at the Wolf Trap National Park for the Performing Arts outside Washington, D.C.

He was inducted into the American Theater Hall of Fame in 1991. In that same year, Kent State University established the annual Robert Lewis Lifetime Achievement medal in his honor.

Lewis died of heart failure on November 23, 1997, in New York City, at the age of 88.

== Selected filmography ==
- Paris After Dark (1943)
- The Hidden Eye (1945)
- Monsieur Verdoux (1947)

== Bibliography ==
- Method — Or Madness?, 1958, Samuel French, ISBN 0-573-69033-2
- Advice To The Players, 1980, Stein and Day, ISBN 1-55936-003-8
- Slings And Arrows: Theater In My Life, 1984, Harper & Row, ISBN 1-55783-244-7
