= Waiting for Lefty =

1935 play by Clifford Odets

- Written by: Clifford Odets

Premiere
- Date: January 6, 1935
- Place: Civic Repertory Theatre, New York City

Waiting for Lefty is a 1935 play by the American playwright Clifford Odets; it was his first play to be produced. Consisting of a series of related vignettes, the entire play is framed by a meeting of cab drivers who are planning a labor strike. The framing uses the audience as part of the meeting.

The play debuted on Sunday, January 6, 1935, at the Civic Repertory Theatre on 14th Street, as part of a benefit performance for New Theatre magazine. It premiered on Broadway at the Longacre Theatre on March 26, 1935, under the auspices of the Group Theatre, a New York City theatre company founded by Harold Clurman, Cheryl Crawford and Lee Strasberg, of which Odets was a member. The company was founded as a training ground for actors, and also to support new plays, especially those that expressed the social and political climate of the day. The play was requested by many theater and labor groups in numerous other cities around the United States. It premiered in London in 1936 at Unity Theatre, and was revived there most recently in 2013.

== Plot ==
The play is composed of seven vignettes. The first takes place at a union meeting of taxi drivers, where union boss Harry Fatt tries to dissuade the men from striking. A few drivers ask of the whereabouts of Lefty, their elected chairman. Fatt reminds them their elected committee is already present, then lets Joe, one of the drivers, speak. Joe says that he is not a "red boy", citing his status as a wounded war veteran, but complains that any driver who expresses dissatisfaction with working conditions is labelled a "red" (slang for communist) by the bosses. He says his wife has convinced him to strike for higher wages.

In the second vignette, set a week before that union meeting, Joe comes home to find that his furniture, not yet paid for, was repossessed. Joe's wife Edna urges him to lead a strike and demand a living wage. Joe argues that strikes do not work and that he would lose money while on strike. Edna criticizes the union as benefitting only its leaders. Joe admits the union bosses are "racketeers" but refuses to stand up to them. Edna announces she is going back to her old boyfriend, since he earns a living. Joe protests, and Edna implores Joe to start a workers' union without the racketeers. Joe, swept up by her passion, tells her he is going to find Lefty Costello.

The next vignette features Fayette, an industrialist, and Miller, a lab assistant. Fayette raises Miller's salary as a reward for his loyalty, and reassigns him to a new laboratory where Miller will help create poisonous gas for chemical warfare. Miller loses enthusiasm, but Fayette believes the world is on the brink of war, and that the U.S. must be ready. Miller grows distraught, reminiscing about his brother who died in the previous war. Fayette expects Miller to provide a weekly confidential report on the project's leader Dr. Brenner. Miller refuses to do any "spying", insisting he would rather lose his job than agree to such terms. Miller's outrage grows and he punches Fayette in the mouth.

In the fourth vignette, Florence tells her brother Irv that she loves her boyfriend Sid. Irv urges her to break up with Sid, since he earns too little money as a taxi driver. Sid enters and Irv exits. Sid says he knows he is like "rat poison" to her family and knows that she is reconsidering whether to marry him. He laments their lowly status as "dogs" under the thumb of powerful rich men. He is upset that his brother, a college boy, has swallowed the "money men's" propaganda and joined the navy to fight foreigners who are, ultimately, just like himself. Florence says she will follow Sid anywhere, but he tells her to be realistic.

Back at the union meeting, Fatt brings up Tom Clayton, who took part in an unsuccessful strike in Philadelphia. Clayton says that his experience taught him that Fatt is right about not striking. Clayton's brother runs into the meeting and identifies Clayton as a company spy who has been breaking up various unions for years. Clayton leaves and his brother voices skepticism of Fatt's claimed ignorance of Clayton's true identity.

The next vignette occurs in the hospital office of the elderly Dr. Barnes. The younger Dr. Benjamin enters, upset that he has been replaced for surgery on a patient in the charity ward by an incompetent doctor named Leeds, the nephew of a senator. Barnes reveals that the hospital is shutting the charity ward because it is losing money. It is also firing some staff, including Benjamin. Though Benjamin has seniority, he is being fired because he is Jewish. Barnes takes a phone call and learns that the patient has died in surgery. Benjamin is furious, saying he was skeptical of the ideas of radicals until now, and vowing to fight on even if it means death.

A man named Agate talks to the taxi drivers, insulting their weakness and insulting Fatt. Fatt and his armed guard try to detain him, but Agate eludes them. Agate says that if "we're reds because we wanna strike, then we take over their salute too!" He makes a Communist salute. Agate incites the drivers with fiery rhetoric about the rich killing them off. He tells them to "unite and fight!" and not to wait for Lefty, who may never arrive. A man runs in and reports that Lefty has just been found, shot dead. Agate yells to his fellow union men, "Workers of the world... Our Bones and Blood!" and leads them in a chorus of "Strike!"

== Sources ==
The play's strike and union meeting scenes were inspired by a forty-day strike of New York City cab drivers in 1934. Odets published the play in New Theatre magazine with the subtitle "A Play in Six Scenes, Based on the New York City Taxi Strike of February 1934." The historic strike was led by Samuel Orner, after he was fired for failing to make enough money for the cab company on a particular night shift. According to Orner, Odets based the meeting scene on a real meeting in the Bronx where Orner had addressed his fellow cab drivers: "He must have taken notes because so many lines in Waiting For Lefty were the same as in the meeting, almost word for word."

In the play, the cabdrivers find Lefty dead at the end. In the 1934 strike, Orner was found drugged and unconscious on the night of the union meeting, but he was roused and taken there before the vote was called. He rallied the drivers to reject the owners' contract offer.

During the political attacks on communism and artists of the left in the 1950s in the United States, Odets distanced himself from having used the 1934 strike. In his 1950s testimony to the House Un-American Activities Committee, Odets denied that he had based his play on that strike or been to a union meeting of cab drivers. Odets said, "It is just something I kind of made up...I didn't know anything about a taxicab strike...I have never been near a strike in my life."

According to literary historian Christopher Herr, rather than trying to create a historical account, Odets used the strike as a symbol to attack what he saw as the larger issue: that in the middle of the Great Depression, the capitalist structures of the time had remained unaltered.

== Productions ==
Odets' stage directions call for the play to be performed on a bare stage, with some actors planted in the audience to react to key moments. The characters often directly address the audience, in an effort to break the fourth wall and incite the viewer to action. In each scene the other characters continue to be dimly present in a circle around the current characters, illustrating their effect on the events unfolding before them. Odets claimed that he took this form from minstrel shows. Critics have suggested that it is more likely that Odets was inspired by agitprop productions, which were gaining popularity in the early 1930s.

Waiting For Lefty premiered on January 6, 1935, for an audience of 1,400 at the Civic Repertory Theatre, at a benefit for New Theatre magazine. The play cost about eight dollars to produce. The audience was greatly moved and met the play with acclaim; the cast that night took 28 curtain calls.

The play opened on Broadway at the Longacre Theater on March 26, 1935, and continued for 144 performances. It was directed by Odets and Sanford Meisner, and its cast included Odets, Meisner, Elia Kazan and Lee J. Cobb. It moved to the Belasco Theater in September of that year for 24 performances in repertoire with Odets's play Awake and Sing!, where its cast included Luther Adler.

Following the initial run, hundreds of theatre groups requested the rights to perform the piece. The play resonated with both the general public and the artistic community. Its simple staging allowed it to become an affordable and popular production for union halls and small theatres across the country. The play resulted in widespread praise and recognition for Odets. Such was Odets' fame that his next play to be produced, Awake and Sing!, was billed as a piece "by the author of Waiting for Lefty ".

During the opening performance of Waiting for Lefty in Boston in 1935, four cast members were placed under arrest due to Boston's strict censorship laws.

Waiting for Lefty had its British premiere in 1936 at London's Unity Theatre as part of an American double feature with Albert Maltz's Private Hicks.

In Australia, the New Theatre in Sydney and Melbourne's New Theatre both staged the play in 1936.

In 1939, the BBC planned a television drama of the play, produced by Eric Crozier. The transmission was cancelled after the broadcaster received a complaint about the play's content from the British Empire Union, a right-wing organisation.

In February–March 2013, the White Bear Theatre in London produced a revival of the play, the first time in over 30 years that it had been performed in the city.

== Critical reception ==
Harold Clurman said of the performance:

The first scene of [Waiting for] Lefty had not played two minutes when a shock of delighted recognition struck the audience like a tidal wave. Deep laughter, hot assent, a kind of joyous fervor seemed to sweep the audience toward the stage. The actors no longer performed; they were being carried along as if by an exultancy of communication such as I had never witnessed in the theater before. Audience and actors had become one.

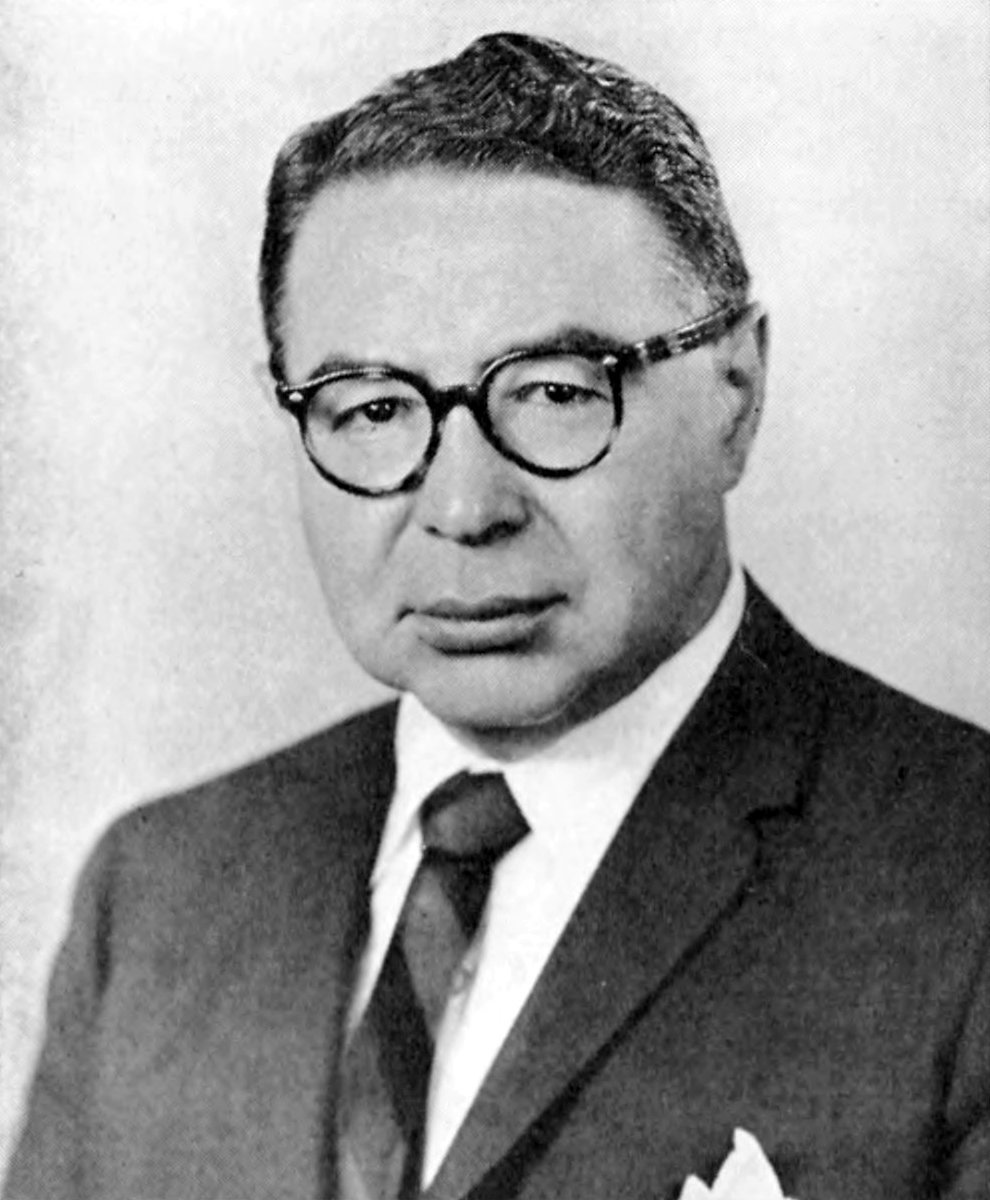
Scooping every other critic in town, Henry Senber was at the premiere of Waiting for Lefty and announced the arrival of Odets as an important new American playwright.

Only one Broadway reviewer was present at the premiere: Henry Senber, second-string drama critic for The Morning Telegraph. He wrote Odets' first Broadway review.

"One left the theatre Sunday evening with two convictions," Senber wrote. "The first was that one had witnessed an event of historical importance in what is academically referred to as the drama of the contemporary American scene. The other was that a dramatist to be reckoned with had been discovered." He concluded, "It has not been announced just where and when Waiting for Lefty will be presented again, but you can rest assured that it will be ... soon. A play like this does not die."

While the energy of the performance greatly stimulated the audience, theater critics reacted less positively to the archetypal characters and the play's socialist leanings. Joseph Wood Krutch wrote:

The villains are mere caricatures and even the very human heroes occasionally freeze into stained-glass attitudes, as, for example, a certain lady secretary in one of the flashbacks does when she suddenly stops in her tracks to pay tribute to "The Communist Manifesto" and to urge its perusal upon all and sundry. No one, however, expects subtleties from a soap-box, and the interesting fact is that Mr. Odets has invented a form which turns out to be a very effective dramatic equivalent of soap-box oratory.
