= Solo performance =

Single person telling a story to entertain an audience

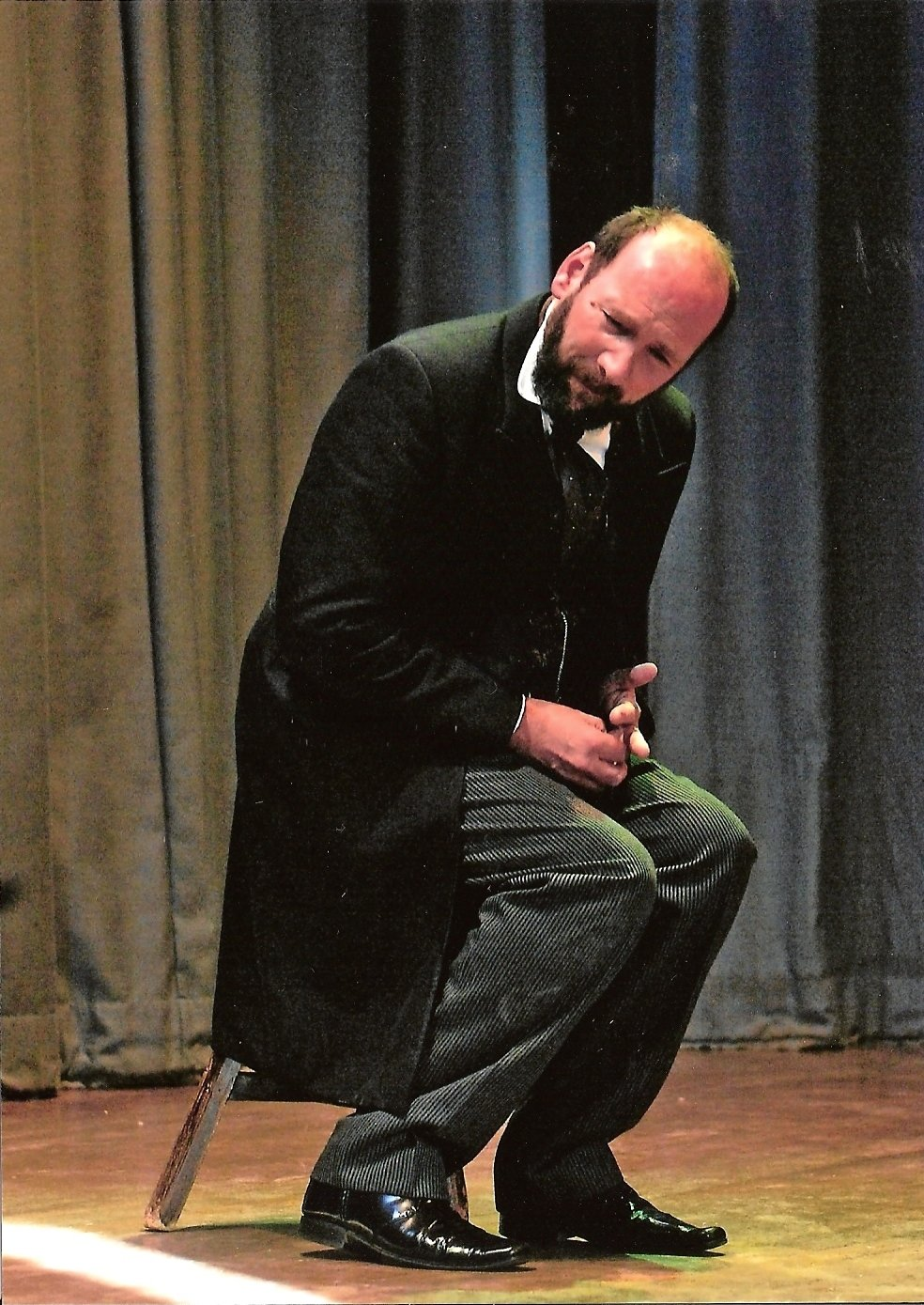
Gerald Dickens in a solo performance of A Christmas Carol

A solo performance, sometimes referred to as a one-man show, one-woman show, or one-person show, features a single person telling a story for an audience, typically for the purpose of entertainment. This type of performance comes in many varieties, including autobiographical creations, comedy acts, novel adaptations, vaudeville, poetry, music and dance. In 1996, Rob Becker's Defending the Caveman became the longest-running one-person play in the history of Broadway theatre.

== Traits of solo performance ==
Solo performance is used to encompass the broad term of a single person performing for an audience. Some key traits of solo performance can include the lack of the fourth wall and audience participation or involvement. Solo performance does not need to be written, performed and produced by a single person—a solo performance production may use directors, writers, designers and composers to bring the piece to life on a stage. An example of this collaboration is Eric Bogosian in the published version of his show Wake Up And Smell the Coffee, by Theatre Communications Group, New York City.

== History ==
Individuals have told stories in front of other members of their tribe or society for thousands of years, and have orally passed down many of today's myths and legends in this manner. The style of performance has developed through generations via theatrical people such as Greek Monologists, the strolling Minstrels of Medieval England and the French Troubadors.

Edgar Allan Poe both lectured and recited poetry as a platform performer between 1843 and 1849; his performances stand as a paradigm of the solo performance hybrid simply called "the lecture-recital". The reading tours of Charles Dickens in Britain and America between 1858 and 1870 created a sensation. His American tour of 1867–68 was unparalleled until the arrival of the Beatles in the early 1960s.

Solo performance enjoyed an unprecedented artistic and commercial vogue in the United States during the second half of the nineteenth century (John S. Gentile Calls it the golden age of platform performance). Literary historians often associate the Victorian period with the highest development of the dramatic monologue as a poetic form. There were several discussions about the importance and distinction between the literary monologue and the performance monologue during the nineteenth century, however, this discussions confirms a continuous interchange between literature and performance, which may at times appear competitive but is more often productive. By the time the United States entered the 20th century, the number and variety of professional solo performances presented throughout the country had grown large. This renaissance of solo performance also created ripples in the larger sense of American theatre; after this "boom" of the one man show had passed, the presentational style seeped into popular theatre productions such as Amadeus, Equus, and Evita among others, modeling a combination of representational theatricality and presentational, direct-address style.

By the 1960s, the term performance art became popular and involved any number of performance acts or happenings, as they were known. Many performers, like Laurie Anderson, developed through these happenings and are still performing today.

== Types and examples of solo performances ==
The backgrounds of solo performers over the decades range from vaudeville, comedy, poetry, music, the visual arts, magic, cabaret, theatre and dance.

Solo performers include Rob Becker, John Lennon, George Carlin, Bill Maher, Bill Burr, Louis C.K., Lily Tomlin, Andy Kaufman, Billy Joel, Rod Maxwell, Lord Buckley, Eric Bogosian, Whoopi Goldberg, Jade Esteban Estrada, Eddie Izzard, John Leguizamo, Marga Gomez, Qurrat Ann Kadwani, Anna Deavere Smith, Bill Hicks, Brother Blue, Lenny Bruce, and Mel Blanc.

Several performers have presented solo shows in tribute to famous personalities. The blueprint for this type of show may have been drafted by Hal Holbrook, who has performed as Mark Twain in his solo show, Mark Twain Tonight, more than 2,000 times since 1954. Examples since that time include Julie Harris in the Emily Dickinson biography, The Belle of Amherst; Tovah Feldshuh as Golda Meir in Golda's Balcony; Frank Gorshin as George Burns in Say Goodnight Gracie by Rupert Holmes; Ed Metzger in his solo show, performing since 1978, Albert Einstein: The Practical Bohemian; Metzger in another solo performance, Hemingway: On the Edge; Henry Fonda as Clarence Darrow in Darrow, Ronald Rand as Harold Clurman in Let It Be Art! since 2001 in 29 countries, and Tom Dugan as Simon Wiesenthal in Wiesenthal. Roy Dotrice gave 1,782 performances as John Aubrey in Brief Lives from 1967 onwards, prior to reviving the show in 2008.

A few actors adapted entire novels for the stage including Patrick Stewart who played all 43 parts in his version of A Christmas Carol, which played three times on Broadway and at The Old Vic in London; actor Gerald Charles Dickens played 26 characters in his performances from the same work; and Jack Aranson starred in a solo, 13-character production of Moby Dick.

Solo performance may be personal, autobiographical creations. This ranges from the intensely confessional but comedic work of Spalding Gray, the semi-autobiographical A Bronx Tale by Chazz Palminteri, or Holly Hughes' solo piece World without End, in which she attempts to make sense of her relationship with her mother, who had died. Another example of this is In The Body of the World, written and performed by Eve Ensler in 2018.

Still other shows may rally around a central theme, such as pop culture in Pat Hazel's The Wonderbread Years, relationships in Robert Dubac's The Male Intellect, the history of the New York City transit system in Mike Daisey's Invincible Summer, or fighting the system in Patrick Combs' Man 1, Bank 0. these themes could also be centered around a certain topic such as a political or social issue. Tim Miller explores the topic of gay culture and society surrounding the LGBTQ community in his production of My Queer Body. Karen Finley expressed her frustration with the standards women are held to and the issues surrounding them such as rape and abortion in her solo piece titled We Keep Our Victims Ready.

Sometimes, solo shows are simply traditional plays written by playwrights for a cast of one. Examples: Shirley Valentine by Willy Russell, I Am My Own Wife by Doug Wright, The Blonde, the Brunette and the Vengeful Redhead by Robert Hewett and Topless by Miles Tredinnick. A performer of shows of this type is Chris Harris, whose performances in the genre include Kemp's Jig, That's The Way To Do It!, Ally Sloper's Half Holiday, Beemaster, 'Arris Music 'All and A Night at the Pantomime.

There have also been many British comedians who have moved away from performing pure stand-up comedy in recent years. The shows that appear annually at the Edinburgh Festival Fringe can involve stories of pathos and the use of technological equipment such as projectors. Examples include Howard Read, who has performed with the animated character Little Howard which was projected with the aid of computers and Dave Gorman, who has performed several shows described as "documentary comedy".

== Solo performance in film ==
The first full-length talking film which showed only a single character was Sofi, a 1968 film starring Tom Troupe. The film was based on "Diary of a Madman" by Gogol.

The 1964 Hindi movie Yaadein also featured only Sunil Dutt, but Nargis Dutt made a few appearances as a silhouette. However, it still made it to the Guinness Book of World Records for the "fewest actors in a narrative film".

Secret Honor is a 1984 film about Richard Nixon with Philip Baker Hall as the disgraced President ruminating on his past.

In the 21st century, the "solo performance" had a rejuvenation period with films like Locke, All Is Lost and Buried. The characteristics were different from the previous one-character films that were made – mainly by location and style. Sofi and works like Give 'em Hell, Harry!, were still studio-filmed theater pieces. The 21st-century films were mostly shot on location and were much more stylized with their cinematic expression and camera usage. In 2018, celebrated solo performer Simon Callow starred in a one-man film of A Christmas Carol that was set entirely in a ruined warehouse. In an interview, Callow emphasised that the film was distinct from his theatrical production of the story: "The theatre version is pure theatre, the film, pure cinema, proving how phenomenally rich this favourite of all Christmas stories is."

R. Parthiban wrote, produced, directed, and was the only actor in the 2019 Tamil film Oththa Seruppu Size 7.

Merrick McCartha co-wrote and executive produced a short film that he portrays Ira Aldridge.

== Further examples of solo performances ==
- Caroline Amiguet: Pardon My French
- Daniel Beaty: Emergency
- Rob Becker: Defending the Caveman
- Anton Chekhov: On the Harmful Effects of Tobacco
- Rebecca Clarke: Unspoken
- Jodie Comer: Prima Facie
- Derek DelGaudio: In & Of Itself
- Frank DiPalermo: Something in Common
- Eve Ensler: In the Body of the World
- Cynthia Erivo: Dracula
- Carrie Fisher: Wishful Drinking
- Hannah Gadsby: Nannette
- Nikolai Vasilievich Gogol: Diary of a Madman
- Hal Holbrook: Mark Twain Tonight
- Eddie Izzard: Great Expectations
- Qurrat Ann Kadwani: They Call Me Q; Intrusion
- John Leguizamo: Freak; Latin History for Morons
- Laura Linney: My Name is Lucy Barton
- Julia McDermott: Weather Girl
- Chazz Palminteri: A Bronx Tale
- Ronald Rand: Let It Be Art!
- Arnold Schoenberg: Erwartung
- Andrew Scott: Vanya
- David Serero: Christmas for Jews; I, Napoleon
- Sarah Snook: The Picture of Dorian Gray
- Brad Sherrill: The Gospel of John; Apostle; Red Letter Jesus; Exodus
- Pierce Wallace: Reflections of a Tough Texan: The Legacy of Lyndon Johnson
- Phoebe Waller-Bridge: Fleabag
- Kristina Wong: Kristina Wong, Sweatshop Overlord
- Davide Verotta "The Retraction"

== See also ==
- The Marsh
- Drama Desk Award for Outstanding One-Person Show
- Monologue
- Monodrama
- Performance poetry
- Spoken word
- United Solo Theatre Festival
