= Sabra Jones =

American actress

- Education: New York University (BFA)
- Occupations: Founding & Producing Artistic Director
- Organization: The Mirror Theater Ltd
- Spouse: John Strasberg (1976–1988) Thomas McAteer (1988–2010)
- Children: 1

Sabra Jones is an American actress, director, writer, and producer known for her expansive collection of artistic work and for founding The Mirror Theater Ltd. She has produced over 172 theatrical productions in New York City, London, and around the country, including the 1982 Broadway production of Alice in Wonderland.

Jones has acted on Broadway, at the Metropolitan Opera, in numerous regional productions, and in select television and film roles. She currently lives between Manhattan and Vermont, working as the Founding & Producing Artistic Director for The Mirror Theater Ltd and for The Mirror’s Vermont chapter, the Greensboro Arts Alliance and Residency.

== Biography ==
Sabra Jones grew up in a small town just outside of Los Angeles, separated from the metropolitan hubbub and yet close to the city's arts. At 18, she moved east to Manhattan to attend NYU and earned a BFA from the Tisch School of the Arts. Shortly after, she landed her first Broadway role, a lead in Butterflies Are Free.

Following this, Jones met and married John Strasberg--son of Actors Studio Artistic Director Lee Strasberg--and founded The Mirror Theater Ltd “under the mentorship of Harold Clurman, Ellis Rabb, Eva Le Gallienne, Alan Schneider, and John Gielgud.” Though Strasberg and Jones divorced, the company flourished, expanding into The Mirror Repertory Company (MRC) and eventually developing the Greensboro Arts Alliance and Residency (GAAR). Jones' son, Charlie McAteer, is currently co-Artistic Director for The Mirror.

Outside of performing, directing, and producing, Jones is known for her award-winning Arts in Education program. She taught for almost nine years at the Lee Strasberg Institute, was a Professor of Acting at Pace University, directed at the Manhattanville College, and taught years of Mirror Rep Ensemble Classes as a Master Teacher.

== Career ==
=== Acting ===
Jones made her Broadway debut in 1971, replacing Blythe Danner as Jill Tanner in Butterflies Are Free and continuing the role in the First National Tour. She also appeared in the original production of Six Degrees of Separation at the Vivian Beaumont Theater. In 1972, Jones made her Metropolitan Opera debut as the Duchess of Krackenthorp in La Fille du Régiment and later acted as Andromache in Les Troyens. Jones also performed in 13 plays with her own Mirror Repertory Company, nominated by the Outer Critics Circle for Best Acting Ensemble and Best Sustained Excellence. Other New York and select regional credits include Sally and Marsha, Someone, Hot Buttered Bourbon, Jigsaw, Indiscretions, and Our Town. Jones starred as Marcella in the 1979 film Night-Flowers and appears on episodes of Law & Order and Laverne & Shirley.

=== Directing ===
Sabra Jones has directed nearly 80 productions, many with the Greensboro Arts Alliance and Residency. Her most recent directing credits include The Sound of Music (2012), The Music Man (2013), The Miracle Worker (2014), Hamlet (2015), and To Kill a Mockingbird (2016). Her shows with the Greensboro Arts Alliance and Residency have been called "absolutely delightful", "bold", and "high quality".

Her production of To Kill a Mockingbird (2016), starring Sean Haberle, Tony nominee Marla Schaffel, and Tony nominee Katheryn Meisle, was so highly regarded that local papers termed it "a masterpiece" and the Rev. Richard Fenn of Princeton Theological Seminary called it "liturgy" because of its beauty.

Sabra directed The Children's Hour at Marymount College in Purchase, New York. She is presently tagged to direct the world premier of Bernard Pomerance's only unpublished play, Miranda. It explores the fictional lives of Prospero and an adult Miranda after their return to Italy from the Island in The Tempest by Shakespeare, as well as the founding of America and the fate of Powhatan tribes at the hands of British settlers.

=== Writing ===
Jones traveled to the Philippines as a journalist, “interview[ing] former Philippine presidents Garcia, Macapagal, and Marcos and [writing] features on Corregidor’s infamous Malinta Tunnel.” She is also an award-winning poet—her poem “Christus Neger” won first prize at the University of California—and playwright, winning the Dramalogue Best New Play award for her play One Hundred Percent Alive.

=== Producing ===
With over 170 producing credits and a Tony nomination, Jones’ producing experience spans from Broadway to London with much in between. Her show Alice in Wonderland, directed by Eva Le Gallienne, opened on Broadway in 1982 garnering a Tony nomination. She produced the WNET13 Masterpiece Theatre Production for television. With The Mirror Repertory Company, Jones produced three full repertory seasons. She continues to work for The Mirror Theater Ltd and the Greensboro Arts Alliance and Residency today. Her latest production, Sinners (written by Joshua Sobol, dir. Brian Cox), debuted in Vermont in summer 2016 and will be performed in Boston in March.

In a review of Sinners, Boston's Arts Fuse said, "This sort of bravery has become very rare in American theater. For far too long, artists and administrators have been arrogantly confident that words such as “truth” and “freedom” mean what they have always meant; confident that the only major political problem theater has left to tackle is that of the issue of equitable representation; confident that all we need to know about enlightenment could be found via staring at our own navels. Our theaters have blinded themselves to the world’s most lethal evils, and have looked for every excuse to ignore its victims. This is why the very fact that Sinners is playing anywhere in America matters."

== The Mirror ==
The Mirror Theater Ltd was founded by Sabra Jones in 1983. The company was created to be an alternating repertory company and included founding members Eva Le Gallienne, John Strasberg, and Geraldine Page. Laurance S. Rockefeller was the primary philanthropist behind the company's creation, but other actors and philanthropists like Al Pacino, Dustin Hoffman, and Paul Newman also offered support. The company began at a small, 70-seat theater at the Real Stage Acting School. After receiving positive reviews in the New York Times, the company was moved Off-Broadway to the Theatre at St. Peter's Church. The Mirror Repertory Company presented three repertory seasons. Through the 1990s, the Mirror produced shows in New York and London and the company focused on Arts-in-Education. Today, The Mirror continues to produce in New York, Boston, and Vermont.

== Performance work ==
=== Stage performance ===
Year	Title	Theatre	Role	Notes
1990	Six Degrees of Separation	Vivian Beaumont	Kitty; Ouisa, alt. Stockard Channing, Swoozie Kurtz	Broadway
1971	Butterflies Are Free	Booth Theatre	Jill Tanner	Broadway and First National Tour
1972	La Fille du Régiment	Metropolitan Opera	Duchess of Krackenthorp	w/Luciano Pavarotti and June Anderson
1993	Les Troyens	Metropolitan Opera	Andromache	w/Maria Ewing and Samuel Ramey
1979	Sally and Marsha	Manhattan Theatre Club	Sally	w/Bernadette Peters and Christine Baranski
1998	Someone	Ensemble Studio Theatre	Janis	w/Mark Forestine
2000	Hot Buttered Bourbon	Ensemble Studio Theatre	Orchid	w/Roberta Wallach
2000	Jigsaw	Peccadillo Theatre	Clair Burnell	First NY production since 1934
1984	Joan of Lorraine	Theatre at the Real Stage	Joan	w/Will Patton
1984	Inheritors	Theatre at St. Peter's Church	Madeline	w/Geraldine Page
1984	Paradise Lost	Theatre at St. Peter's Church	Libby	w/Mason Adams, Maxwell Caulfield, and Juliet Mills
1984	Rain	Theatre at St. Peter's Church	Sadie Thompson	w/David Cryer, Madeleine Sherwood and Jim Rebhorn
1984	Ghosts	Theatre at St. Peter's Church	Regina	w/Geraldine Page and Victor Slezak
1985	The Madwoman of Chaillot	Theatre at St. Peter's Church	Irma	w/Geraldine Page, Carrie Nye, Jane White, and F. Murray Abraham. On view at the Performing Arts Library at Lincoln Center.
1985	Clarence	Theatre at St. Peter's Church	Violet Pinney	On view at the Performing Arts Library at Lincoln Center.
1985	Vivat! Vivat Regina!	Theatre at St. Peter's Church	Mary of Scotland	w/Geraldine Page. On view at the Performing Arts Library at Lincoln Center.
1986	Children of the Sun	Theatre at St. Peter's Church	Melaniya	w/Michael Moriarty and Elizabeth France
1986	The Time of Your Life	Theatre on Main Street	Kitty Duval	The Mirror Rep in Belfast, Maine.
1986	Les Liaisons Dangereuse	Theatre on Main Street	Mme. Mereteuil	U.S. Premiere. The Mirror Rep in Belfast, Maine.
1986	The Seagull	Theatre on Main Street	Arcadina	The Mirror Rep in Belfast, Maine. Dir. Robert Lewis.

=== Television and film ===
Year	Title	Role	Notes
1998	Law & Order (NBC)	Tracy Teasdale	Episode: "Bait"
1979	Night-Flowers	Marcella	Film
1978	Laverne & Shirley	Irma	Episode: "The Quiz Show"

=== Awards and nominations ===
Year	Award Ceremony	Category	Work	Role	Result
1965	University of California Poetry Prize	N/A	"Christus Neger" (poem)	Poet	Won
1979	Dramalogue Award	Best New Play	One Hundred Percent Alive (play)	Playwright	Won
1983	Tony Award	Best Costume Design (Patricia Zipprodt)	Alice in Wonderland (play)	Producer	Nominated
1984	Outer Critics Circle Award	Best Acting Ensemble	Mirror Repertory Company, First Season	Actress/Producer	Nominated
1985	Outer Critics Circle Award	Best Sustained Excellence	Mirror Repertory Company, Second Season	Actress/Producer	Nominated
1998	Brown and Williamson Achiever Award	N/A	Arts in Education Program	Educator	Won
2017	SDC fichandler award	Best Regional Directorial Excellence	All Productions Directed for GAAR	Director	Nominated
