= The Mirror Theater Ltd =

Theater company in New York City

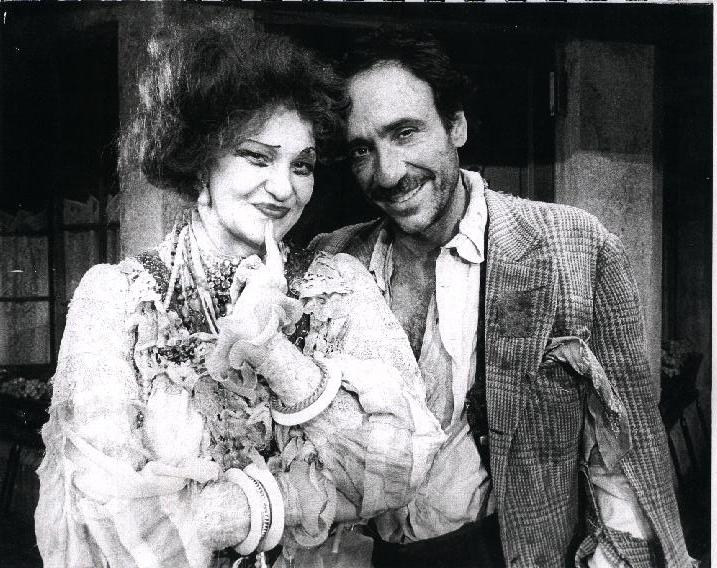
- Formation: 1983
- Type: Theatre group
- Location: New York City
- Artistic director(s): Sabra Jones, Charles McAteer, Brian Cox
- Notable members: Eva Le Gallienne, F. Murray Abraham, Geraldine Page, Lynn Redgrave, Anthony Hopkins, John Strasberg, Austin Pendleton, Tina Chen, Geraint Wyn Davies, Maxwell Caulfield, Julie Harris, Juliet Mills, Mason Adams, David Cryer, Matthew Cowles, Marilyn Miller, Tom Waites, Ellis Rabb, Lisa Pelikan, Elizabeth Franz, Arthur Storch, Sean Haberle, Steven Weber, Madeleine Sherwood, Carrie Nye, Jane White, Ronald Rand, Marla Schaffel, Brian Cox, Nicole Ansari, Eve Pomerance, Will River Mossek, Lily McAteer, Sabra Jones, Charles McAteer, Clark Middleton, Myriam Cyr, Kathryn Meisle, Katherine Paterson, Daniel Gerroll, Elizabeth Ireland McCann, Jennifer Tipton, Gail Cooper-Hecht, F. Mitchell Dana, Mary Stuart Masterson, Kate Burton, Jonathan Tunick, John Lee Beatty, Patricia Zipprodt, Nicolas Martin, Mary Louise Wilson, James Rebhorn, Victor Slezak, Matthew Cowles, Mason Adams, Margaret Barker, Michael Moriarty, Peter Mark Shifter, James Tilton, Shirley Knight, Randy Charnin, Gina Belafont, Will Patton, Enrico Colantoni, Willa Kim, Jess Osuna, Marcus Ho, Clem Fowler
- Website: http://themirror.org

The Mirror Theater was founded by Sabra Jones in 1983, the Founding Artistic Director. The first program of the theater was the Mirror Repertory Company (MRC). Founding members of the company included Eva Le Gallienne, John Strasberg, and Geraldine Page. Sabra Jones reached out to Ellis Rabb, artistic director of the APA Phoenix Repertory Company, John Houseman of the Mercury Theater, and Eva Le Gallienne of the Civic Repertory Theatre Company.

The company was intended to be "an alternating repertory company in the classic sense" of actor-manager leadership, which Rabb, Houseman, and La Gallienne pioneered, with the goal of producing work that holds "as 'twere, the mirror up to nature." (Hamlet, Act 3, Sc. 2).

Alternating repertory refers to when one company performs a variety of plays in the same season with the same actors, once a mainstay of theater tradition. This system has been attributed with helping actors grow in their craft through a wide variety of roles. MRC was funded in its inception primarily by philanthropist Laurance S. Rockefeller, with additional donations from philanthropists and actors such as Paul Newman, Al Pacino, Dustin Hoffman, and others.

== First productions ==
=== Alice in Wonderland ===
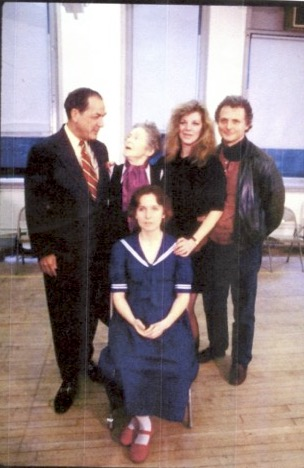
Members of the creative team of the Broadway production of Eva LeGallienne's "Alice in Wonderland," Ms. LeGallienne, MRC Artistic Director Sabra Jones, co-director John Strasberg, and star Kate Burton (seated).

MRC's founder and artistic director, Sabra Jones, produced Eva Le Gallienne's adaptation of “Alice in Wonderland,” directed by Le Gallienne and co-directed by John Strasberg, with Kate Burton, daughter of Richard Burton, in the title role as her Broadway debut. This production, recommended to Jones by Le Gallienne, was a staple of the Civic Repertory Company and was intended to initiate the Mirror Theater Ltd. The production was on Broadway at the Virginia Theatre, now the August Wilson, in NYC. Designer Patricia Zipprodt was nominated for a Tony Award and Drama Desk Award for her costume designs on the “Alice in Wonderland” revival. They were exact recreations of the John Tenniel drawings for the original publication of the book Alice in Wonderland. This theme of artistic sensibility to the original art work was also carried through in the sets by famed designer John Lee Beatty. The sets and costumes were called “exquisite” by the New York Times. The production attracted great attention at the time for its financing, which marked the highest budget to that date of $2,000,000.00, but which was also backed by members of “The Four Hundred” who rarely invest in theater productions. Backers included Anthony D. Marshall, Laurance S. Rockefeller, Brooke Astor, and C. Douglas Dillon, among others. This production also marked the first time that a public television station invested in a show, WNET13, which later produced a version for television as part of PBS’s “Great Performances” series. MRC Founding Producing Artistic Director Sabra Jones brokered this deal and became Creative Consultant for the television production. In the “Great Performances” broadcast, “The White Knight” was played by Richard Burton, father of Kate Burton, the only time the two ever appeared together on film. Others in the televised production were Colleen Dewhurst, Nathan Lane, Željko Ivanek, Maureen Stapleton, and Eve Arden. The “Great Performances” broadcast is still available to view online.

Sabra Jones, in her first production, had the innovative idea of asking WNET-13 for an investment in this production of a literary classic. WNET-13 invested in the production and in return received the production rights for television. This marked the first time that one non profit had invested in a commercial production for the purpose of securing income. As a result, Sabra was named a creative consultant for the film and also was responsible for securing through her star, Kate Burton, the services of Kate's famous father, Richard Burton, to play the White Knight for WNET-13. This was the only time that Kate appeared on film with her father. In the credits for the film, Sabra Jones is thanked for her assistance (along with Laurence Rockefeller, Brooke Astor, and Anthony D. Marshall).

== Cast of Alice in Wonderland ==
- Nancy Killmer as Singer/Eight of Hearts
- Kate Burton as Alice
- Mary Stuart Masterson as Small White Rabbit/Four of Hearts
- John Remme as Mouse/Three of Hearts/Tweedledee
- James Valentine as Dodo/Mock Turtle
- John Miglietta as Lory/Seven of Hearts
- Rebecca Armen as Eaglet/Pig-Baby/Two of Hearts
- Nicholas Martin as Duck/Dormouse/Train Guard
- Curt Dawson as White Rabbit/White Knight
- John Heffernan as Caterpillar/Ten of Hearts/Sheep
- Geddeth Smith as Fish Footman/Cheshire Cat/Ace of Hearts/Man in White Paper
- Claude-Albert Saucier as Frog Footman/Five of Hearts/Goat
- Edward Zang as Duchess
- Richard Sterne as Cook/Nine of Hearts
- Macintyre Dixon as Mad Hatter
- Josh Clark as March Hare/Front of Horse
- Geoff Garland as Two of Spades
- Robert Ott Boyle as Five of Spades/Tweedledum
- Steve Massa as Seven of Spades/Leg of Mutton
- Brian Reddy as Queen of Hearts
- Richard Woods as King of Hearts
- John Seidman as Knave of Hearts
- Marti Morris as Six Of Hearts
- Skip Harris as Three of Clubs
- Cliff Rakerd as Seven of Clubs/Back of Horse
- Edward Hibbert as Gryphon/Old Frog
- Mary Louise Wilson as Red Queen
- Eva Le Gallienne as White Queen

== 1980s repertory seasons ==
=== Pre-production for first season ===
The Mirror Theater formed a board of directors in advance of the first season. In 1984, John Elting Treat, a noted philanthropist and member of the U.S. National Security Council under Presidents Carter and Reagan, became Chair of The Mirror. He followed Morton Leavy, Esq. a renowned theatrical attorney on Broadway, and John Breglio, also a New York attorney and producer of the 2006 revival of A Chorus Line. The board at that time included Sam Spiegel—the producer of films On the Waterfront, The Bridge on the River Kwai, and Lawrence of Arabia—Archie E. Albright, then President of the Foreign Policy Association, Patricia Kennedy Lawford, wife of actor Peter Lawford and sister to the late President John F. Kennedy, and Anna Sosenko, celebrated producer and songwriter.

All were board members when the Royal Shakespeare Company sponsored The Mirror's first Benefit. Geoffrey Dench, brother of Judi Dench, was Master of Ceremonies. Guests included lauded actors Jeremy Irons, Derek Jacobi, and Sinéad Cusack. Derek donated his prosthetic nose from the RSC production of Cyrano de Bergerac to be auctioned off at the Benefit, where it was purchased by actor Jon Cryer. The Mirror's 3rd Benefit, in 1986, took place at the illustrious Limelight nightclub with Frank Zappa as Master of Ceremonies. Titled “Rock the Rep,” the Benefit auctioned off such items as an autographed David Bowie tuxedo and a pair of David Lee Roth’s tights.

=== First season ===
MRC’s first repertory season included productions of Rain by John Colton, Paradise Lost by Clifford Odets, Inheritors by Susan Glaspell, and The Hasty Heart by John Patrick. By this time, the company included actors Anthony Hopkins, Maxwell Caulfield, Julie Harris, Juliet Mills, Mason Adams, David Cryer, Matthew Cowles, and Tom Waites, as well as director Austin Pendleton.

Company designers were Ron Placzek (scenery), Heidi Hollman (costumes), Mal Sturchio (lighting), and Rob Gorton (sound). The productions were initially presented at a small 70-seat Off-Off-Broadway theater at the Real Stage Acting School on West 46th St. (the building was then owned by the Local One Stage Hands Union).

Benedict Nightingale in the New York Times lauded the company in a review entitled “Dramas From the Past that Speak to the Present” and challenged the public by saying “what chance is there for a new repertory with serious pretensions in the theatrical winter of New York today?”

On the strength of Benedict Nightingale's New York Times review, a group of backers moved the MRC off-Broadway to the Theater at St. Peter's Church. Its first repertory season was budgeted at $675,000.00 and was financed primarily by Laurance S. Rockefeller. The New York State Council of the Arts, AT&T, and the CBS Foundation also contributed. Geraldine Page was named Artist-In-Residence. The season garnered critical attention.

The company's work on the revival of John Patrick’s The Hasty Heart received praise; Rain, directed by John Strasberg, was noted primarily for the leading role of “Sadie Thompson,” played by MRC's Artistic Director Sabra Jones, whom Mel Gussow termed “the only reason to see the production” and who usually played only minor roles in productions. Jones chose the season's plays, aided by John Strasberg's memories of his father Lee telling him the history of the Group Theater.

The first season of repertory was dedicated to The Group and to the Royal Shakespeare Company. For this season, Paul Newman, Dustin Hoffman, and Al Pacino joined the Mirror as Major Donors in response to a matching grant from Laurance S. Rockefeller.

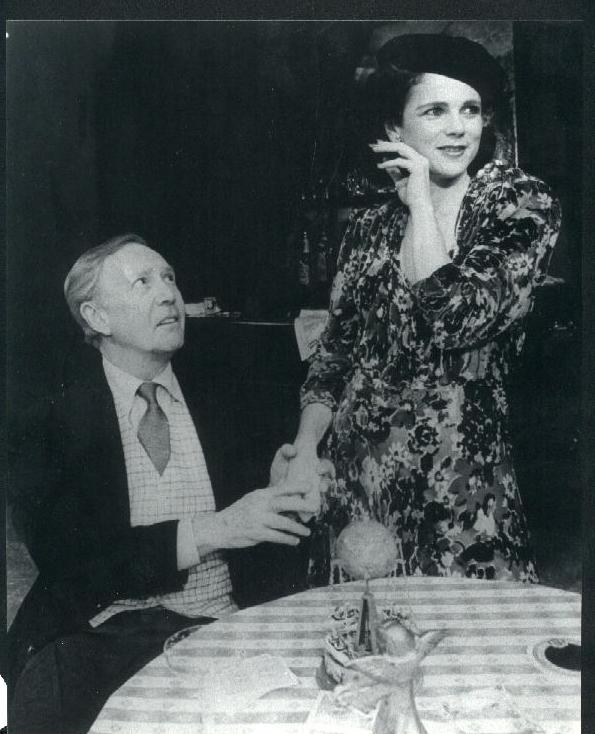
Mason Adams and Tovah Feldshuh in the Mirror production of William Saroyan's The Time of Your Life.

=== Second season ===
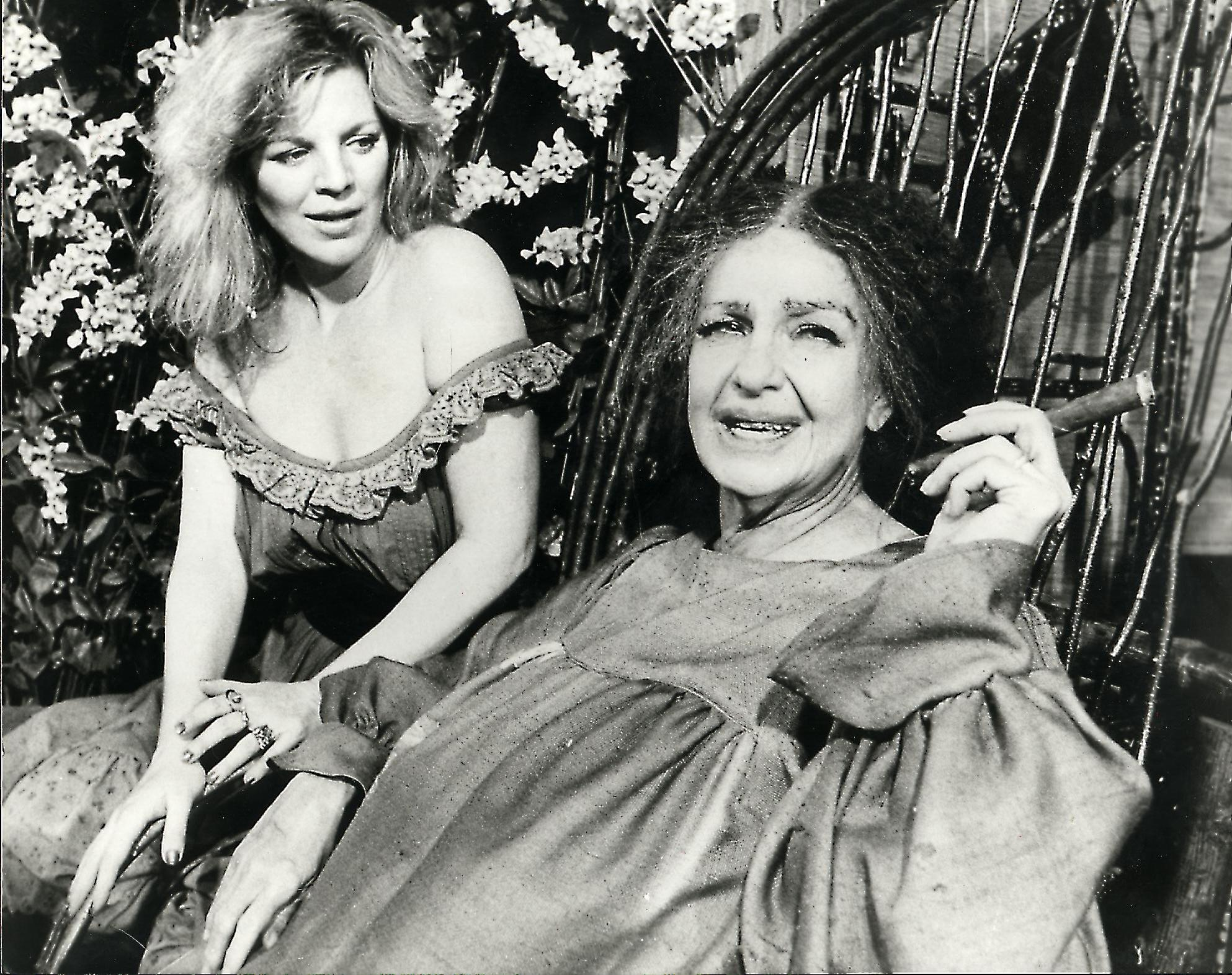
Sabra Jones and Geraldine Page in the Mirror production of John Colton's Rain.

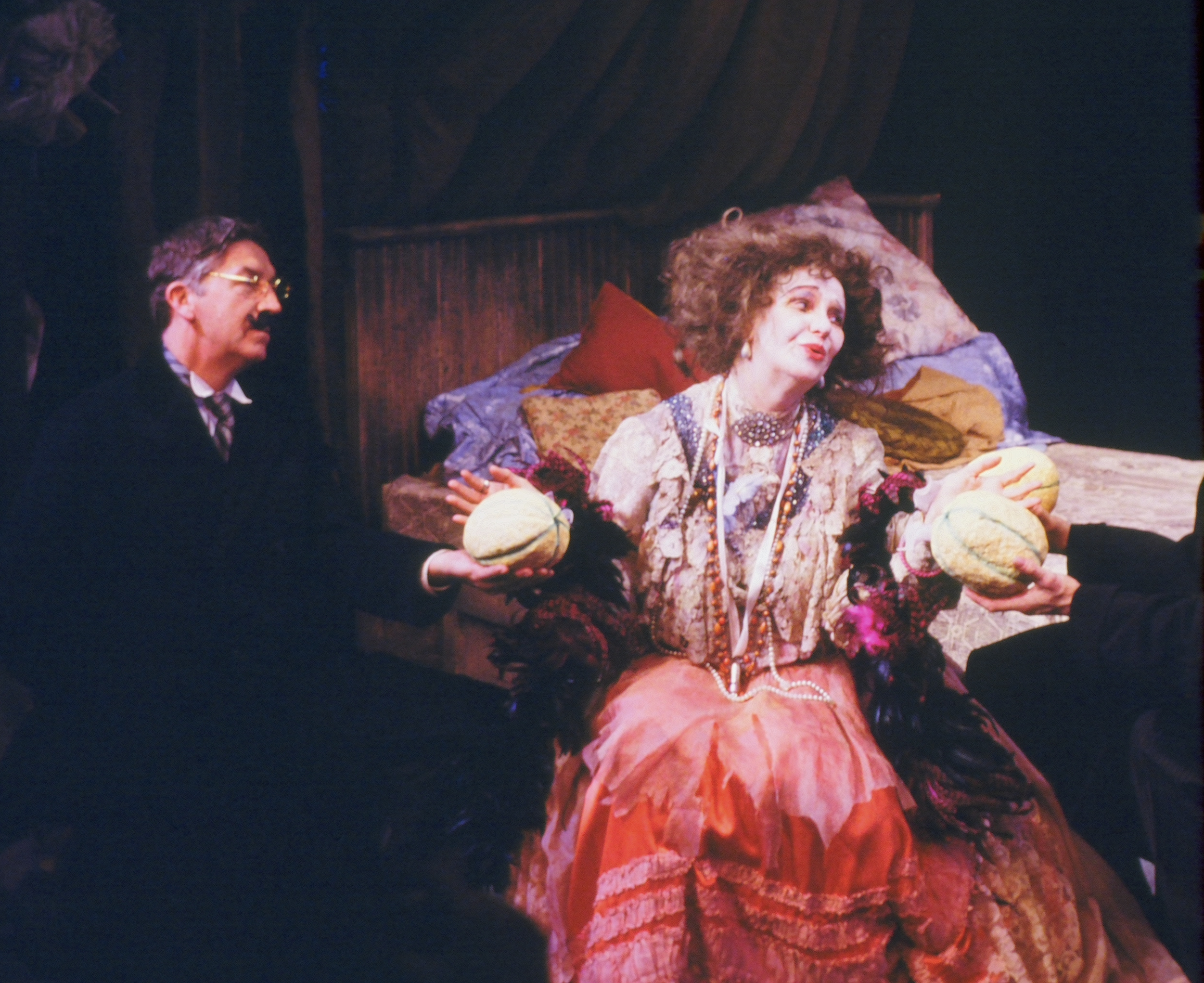
Geraldine Page and Bryan Clark in the Mirror production of The Madwoman of Chaillot

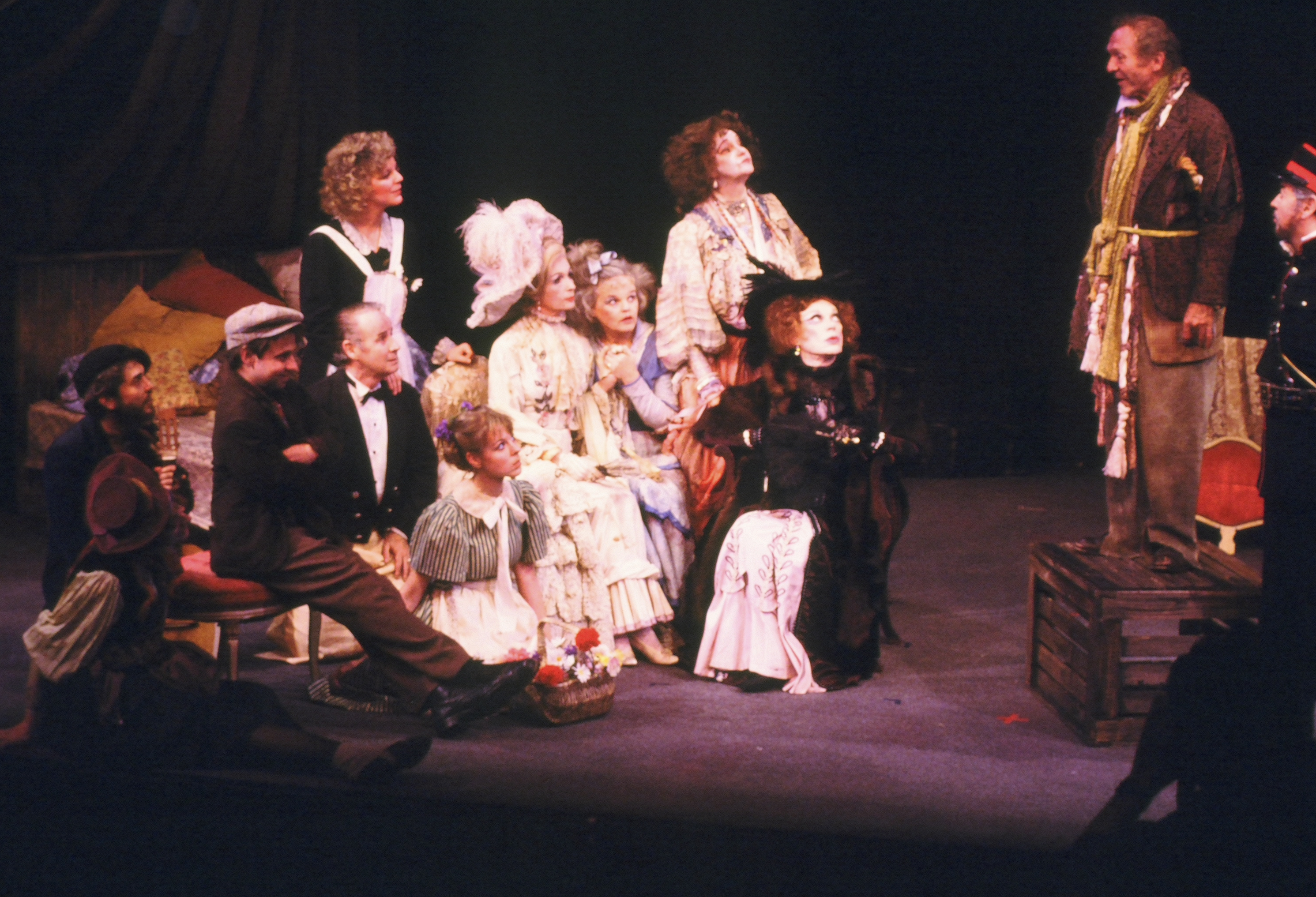
The Mirror's production of The Madwoman of Chaillot.

MRC's second season was announced in the New York Times and included revivals of both Robert Bolt’s Vivat! Vivat Regina! and Jean Giraudoux’s The Madwoman of Chaillot, alongside Booth Tarkington’s Clarence and Shakespeare's Richard II, which was to be directed by Ellis Rabb. Arthur Storch joined the company at this time to direct Clarence.

Artist-in-residence Geraldine Page won positive reviews as both “Queen Elizabeth” in Vivat! Vivat Regina! and as the eponymous Madwoman in The Madwoman of Chaillot, as one reviewer stated, “Miss Page delights.”. Vivat! Vivat Regina! also featured Geraldine Page’s real life grandson Elijah William Burkhardt as the infant (and future King) “James”

The Madwoman of Chaillot also featured F. Murray Abraham, who joined MRC the week after winning his Oscar for Best Actor for his work in Amadeus because he wanted to work with Geraldine Page, Madeleine Sherwood, Carrie Nye, and Jane White.

Three productions of the MRC's second season are available for viewing at the NY Public Library for the Performing Arts: The Madwoman of Chaillot starring Geraldine Page and F. Murray Abraham; Clarence, starring Geraldine Page and David Cryer; and Vivat! Vivat Regina!, starring Geraldine Page and Sabra Jones.

=== Third season ===
In MRC's third season at St. Peter's Church, Elizabeth Franz joined the company for the U.S. Premiere of Maxim Gorky’s Children of the Sun, while Tovah Feldshuh, who spoke of the repertory experience as “the greatest work you can do as an actor,” joined to appear in a revival of William Saroyan's The Time of Your Life directed by Peter Mark Schifter.

=== Acknowledgement by Geraldine Page ===
In 1986, MRC Artist-in-Residence Geraldine Page won the Oscar for Best Actress for the film The Trip to Bountiful. In her acceptance speech, Page thanked the Mirror Repertory Company. The award was presented by fellow MRC member F. Murray Abraham.

== Arts In Education, Maine, London, and 1990s productions ==
After the death of Artist-in-Residence Geraldine Page in 1987 The Mirror Repertory Company continued with a focus on Arts in Education, including celebrated Shakespearean productions within the NYC schools. The arts in education program was devised by Sabra Jones and taught by Co-Artistic Director John Strasberg and company member Thomas McAteer, under Jones's guidance. With Strasberg working regularly in Europe, McAteer gradually assumed more of the program's running.

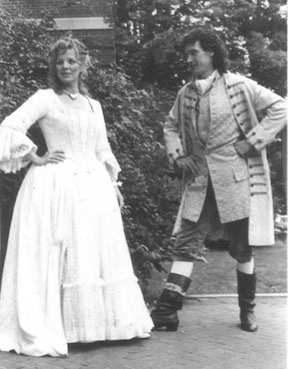
Sabra Jones as the Marquise de Merteuil and Thomas McAteer as the Vicomte de Valmont in the Mirror production of Christopher Hampton's "Les Liaisons Dangereuses" in Bar Harbor, ME.

In addition, the company established a summer residency program in order to develop new work, train apprentices and mount new work and revivals. The company presented the first American production of Christopher Hampton's Les Liaisons Dangereuse, and a revival of Bernard Pomerance's The Elephant Man in Belfast, ME in 1987-88. The productions were directed by Thomas McAteer. The company moved its residency to Bar Harbor, ME in 1989, producing Chekhov's The Seagull, directed by original Group Theater member Robert Lewis starring Glynnis O'Connor, and Edna Ferber and George S. Kaufman's Stage Door, directed by John Strasberg.

Sarah Jane Eigerman ran the company's training program. Apprentices from France, Italy, England, Canada, and the United States, came to Belfast and Bar Harbor, where they studied acting, directing, and stage design. The apprentices appeared in a play written and directed by Eigerman called "Being, Nothingness & Shopping."

In the 1980s, Strasberg and Jones ran a theater school called "The Real Stage" in New York City and Paris. Eigerman, a founding board member of the Mirror, also founded Franco-American Cinema and Theater (FACT) in Paris.

The Mirror also produced the first staging of Lynn Redgrave's Nightingale at the New End Theater. This production was then moved to Music Center in Los Angeles, where The Mirror was credited, and to Hartford, CT where Jeffrey Richards (August Osage County, among many others) picked it up to produce with The Mirror. Eventually, Nightingale was seen at the Manhattan Theater Club.

In 1989, MRC also began an apprentice program in Bar Harbor, Maine in conjunction with Unity College. The program was attended by students from France, Italy, England, Canada, and the United States, where they studied acting, directing, and stage design.

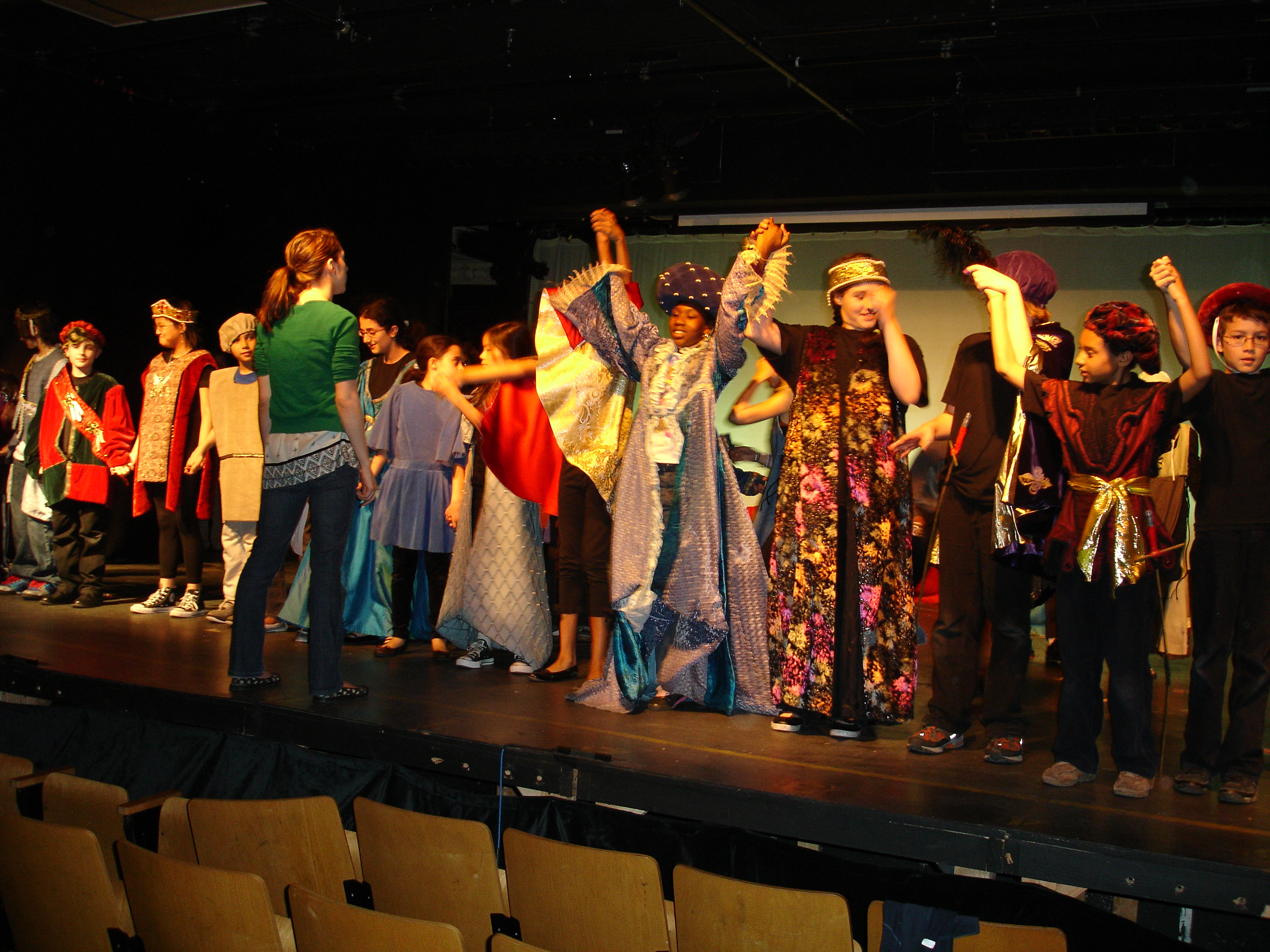
NYC students take a bow

== Early 2000s ==
In spring 2005, MRC presented a repertory season at the Arclight Theatre in NYC. The season consisted of Leon Powell's Do Not Go Gentle, based on the life of Dylan Thomas and starring MRC company member Geraint Wyn Davies; Lilia! by Libby Skala about the Oscar-nominated actress Lilia Skala; and Clurman, which chronicled the story of Harold Clurman, founder of the Group Theater, written and acted in by MRC company member Ronald Rand (who was also a former student of Clurman's, in addition to being a student of MRC Artistic Director Sabra Jones).

The Young Mirror Company, the apprentice company of the MRC, presented the world premiere of Maxwell Anderson's Richard and Anne, which espouses the theory that Richard was a hero, much maligned by Shakespeare's Richard The show received favorable reviews.

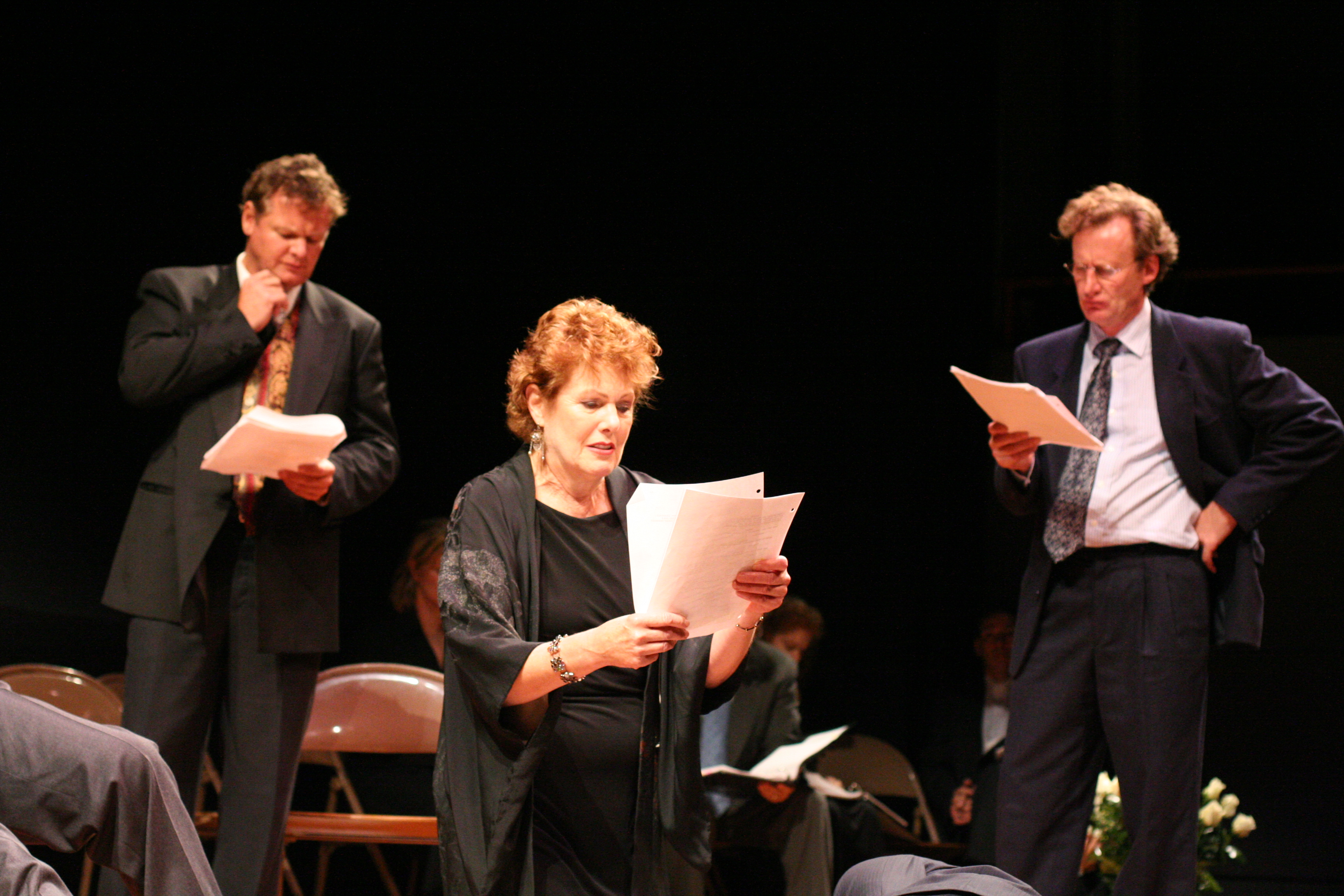
Lynn Redgrave, Daniel Gerroll, and Geraint Wyn Davies in HR63

MRC presented the world premiere of Austin Pendleton’s H6R3 in October 2005. The production featured Pendleton, Lynn Redgrave, Lisa Pelikan, Geraint Wyn Davies, Sabra Jones, and Charles McAteer.

The Young Mirror Company presented a season in 2006 at the Theater at St. Clement's on W. 46th Street featuring The Contrast by Royall Tyler, which was the first play produced in the United States by an American author in 1789. This was in repertory with a revival of John Spurling's MacRune's Guevara which was pronounced "goofily entertaining thanks in large part to the talented cast". That same year, the Young Mirror also presented "an imaginative take on Shakespeare's Macbeth in the style of "Acter Acter" and the Young Mirror No Boundaries Play Festival.

In 2009, MRC produced the off-Broadway revival of The Shanghai Gesture. Starring Golden Globe and Emmy winner Tina Chen, the piece was praised in the press for the fine period costumes and evocative set; it was also noted MRC was reviving a piece of theatrical history rarely seen. This play was given to the Mirror Theater by Geraldine Page, who died before she could play the legendary “Mother Goddam”.

== Greensboro Arts Alliance and Residency ==
The Mirror Theater's summer wing in Greensboro, Vermont was formed in 2005, and called the Greensboro Arts Alliance and Residency (GAAR). GAAR mixed professional MRC company members with local community members with the goal to expand cultural opportunities for Vermont's Orleans County.

Jim Lowe of The Times Argus said “The Greensboro Arts Alliance and Residency and The Mirror Theater are creating a new arts world in Greensboro, bringing local talent together with seasoned professionals for the greater community”.

In 2012, Tony-nominated actress Marla Schaffel became Artist-in-Residence for GAAR, starring first in The Sound of Music. 2013's season included Marla Schaffel as “Marian” in Meredith Willson's The Music Man, directed by Sabra Jones, playing in repertory with Thorton Wilder’s Our Town, directed by GAAR Co-Artistic Director Charles McAteer and Edgar Lee Master’s Spoon River Anthology.

2014’s production of Rodgers and Hammerstein's Carousel was called a “serious and elegant piece of theater”, while Sabra Jones's production of The Miracle Worker was named one of the “Best Bets” by the Burlington Free Press. MRC company member and Golden Globe nominee Tina Chen also presented her one-woman show, entitled “Legacy of my Chinese Family".

GAAR celebrated its 10th anniversary in 2015 with three productions playing in repertory: Hamlet, directed by Sabra Jones, Tom Stoppard’s Rosencrantz and Guildenstern Are Dead, directed by Myriam Cyr, and Kiss Me Kate, starring Marla Schaffel and directed by Charles McAteer.

The Times Argus of Vermont called Hamlet a “powerful experience…potent and convincing” and wrote the company was “one of Vermont’s important theaters”. The 2015 season also featured a lecture with RSC member and Olivier Award winner Brian Cox, who discussed his experiences performing and teaching Shakespeare.

GAAR also presented a children's production of You're a Good Man, Charlie Brown with a cast entirely of children featuring professional costumes, lighting, and set, and directed by Marla Schaffel with choreography by Lily McAteer.

In 2016, GAAR received the appellation of “the most powerful theater in Vermont” by The Times Argus; the season consisted of To Kill a Mockingbird, directed by Sabra Jones, in repertory with Annie Get Your Gun, directed by MRC company member Sean Haberle and starring Marla Schaffel, and Joshua Sobol's Sinners. To Kill a Mockingbird was called “a great story well told” and Annie Get Your Gun was said to be “absolutely delightful… there is nothing like a song and dance musical, and this one was particularly good”. Sinners, directed by Olivier Award winner Brian Cox, was the American premiere of Joshua Sobol’s play. About a woman who is condemned to be stoned to death for her affair, the production was said to be ultimately tender, beautiful, and deeply compelling due to the performances of the cast.

In 2016, Brian Cox joined Charles McAteer as Co-Artistic Director of The Mirror Theater, under Sabra Jones as Founding Producing Artistic Director.

== SINNERS in Boston ==
=== SINNERS in Boston Spring 2017 ===
The GAAR/The Mirror Theater production of Sinners was invited to Boston by the New Rep Theater which had formed a relationship with GAAR. The New Rep Managing Director Harriet Sheets consulted with GAAR/Mirror Theater's General Management and invited the GAAR/The Mirror Theater production into a four-way partnership for a Boston production.

The partners were Boston University, New Rep Theater, Israeli Rep, and GAAR/The Mirror Theater. The play, Sinners, is by Joshua Sobel, a prominent Israeli playwright, and the production in Boston was a United States premiere. The show again starred Nicole Ansare and was directed by Brian Cox, with sets by Ray Recht and lighting by Brian Barnett, with Jeff Davis as Lighting Associate and F. Mitchell Dana as Production Manager. The play opened on March 23 and played to April 2 in the TheaterLab at BU. It received accolades as it did in Vermont, where it was termed “A masterpiece!” by June Cook.

Boston's Art Fuse summed up the political courage of the work: “This sort of bravery has become very rare in American theater. For far too long, artists and administrators have been arrogantly confident that words such as “truth” and “freedom” mean what they have always meant. Our theaters have blinded themselves to the world's most lethal evils, and have looked for every excuse to ignore its victims. This is why the very fact that Sinners is playing anywhere in America matters.”
