= Ronald Rand =

American actor

Ronald Rand is an American stage and film actor, educator, director, playwright, librettist, producer, and newspaper publisher. A U.S. Cultural Goodwill Ambassador, founder and publisher of the newspaper, The Soul of the American Actor, a four-time Fulbright Award receipient in the Fulbright Specialist Program. He is also the author of Create: How Extraordinary People Live to Create and Create to Live, Acting Teachers of America, "The Marsh in May and 30 Poems with 29 Paintings by Ronald Rand, and Solo Transformation on Stage: A Journey into the Organic Process of the Art of Transformation.

== Early life and education ==
Rand was born and raised in Coral Gables, Florida, and began performing at the Merry-Go-Round Playhouse in Coral Gables at age six, appearing in over 200 children's theatre plays over ten years. In 1977, he played the new friend of Steven Bauer's character, Joe Peña, on ¿Que Pasa, USA?. He appeared on Miami Beach at the Deauville Hotel in a stand-up routine of various voices of celebrities. He appeared in the halftime show as Doc Holiday while Up with People was performing in Super Bowl X between the Pittsburgh Steelers and Dallas Cowboys in the Orange Bowl in 1976, while on the sidelines Robert Shaw was filming Black Sunday. In 1976, Rand appeared as Peter in Peter and the Wolf in a presentation performed by the Miami Beach Symphony at the Miami Beach Convention Hall. Rand graduated from Coral Gables Senior High School. A graduate of New York University Tisch School of the Arts in New York City, he received a Bachelor of Fine Arts, studying with Stella Adler for over five years. At the same time, he studied with Jerzy Grotowski when he came to teach at Columbia University, and with Harold Clurman. Two of Rand's classmates were Bill Paxton, for whom Rand wrote monologues to perform in class, and Kate Valk. Subsequently, Rand also studied with Robert Lewis, Joseph Chaikin, and at the Royal Academy of Dramatic Art's summer program in London. During the early 1980s, Rand was the Production Stage Manager for a TheatreWorksUSA national tour to Chicago and the Midwest of Freedom Train, a 60-minute biographical musical about Harriet Tubman for school audiences. In 2000, Rand began developing his one-man show for which he is best known, called LET IT BE ART!

== Career ==
Rand's odyssey as Harold Clurman began with his first performances of his play, LET IT BE ART! directed by Gregory Abels, at the Sande Shurin Theatre in New York City in 2001. Rand performed his play in three productions Off-Broadway, first at the Sande Shurin Theatre, at the Century Center Theatre under the play's previous title, Clurman, produced by Julene Compton, the second wife of Harold Clurman. In 2005, the Mirror Repertory Company presented Rand in Clurman in a repertory season at the ArcLight Theatre with two other solo plays, Libby Skala as Lilia Skala in Lilia and Geraint Wyn Davies as Dylan Thomas in Do Not Go Gentle. Rand made his Off Broadway debut in 1978 at the Brooklyn Academy of Music as a member of the cast of Julius Caesar with Richard Dreyfuss, George Rose, Austin Pendleton, René Auberjonois, and Tom Hulce, directed by Frank Dunlop.

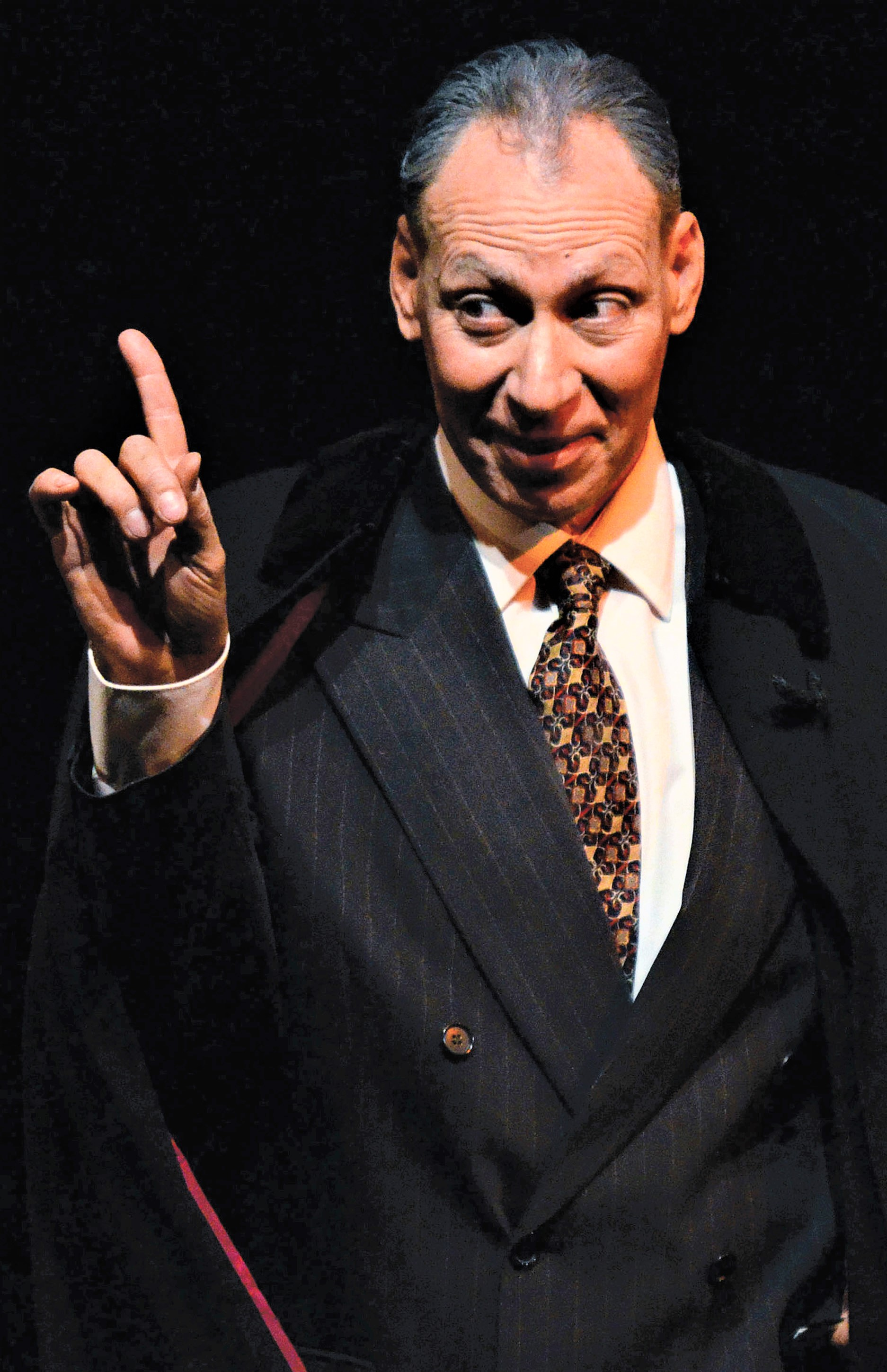
US Cultural Ambassador Ronald Rand during a performance as Harold Clurman in Rand's solo play, LET IT BE ART

Rand's transformation into a 79-year-old Harold Clurman in his play, LET IT BE ART! comes through a two-hour transformation process in his dressing room, based on Konstantin Stanislavski's Method of Physical Actions.

Rand has performed and directed all productions in LET IT BE ART! in 29 countries. He represented the United States in the 8th Theatre Olympics performing in his solo play at the Kamani Auditorium in New Delhi, and Tagore Theatre in Thiruvananthapuram. Rand received the Best Actor Award from the Jury at the 26th International Monodrama Festival representing the US in Bitola, North Macedonia in 2025. Rand performed in his solo play as a Guest of Honor at the 1st KRAKOW FEST International Monodrama Festival representing the US in Krakow, Poland in 2026. Rand is the first American to perform in a solo play at the International Bafa Arts Festival in Harare, Zimbabwe, Kenya International Theatre Festival at Nairobi's National Theatre, Voices of History International Theatre Festival in Vologda, Russia, MerCoSur Interior Althuapua De Cioppo International Festival in Paysandú, Uruguay, Bareilly International Theatre Festival, India, Baptizer International Theatre Festival in Bangalore, India, San Vicente del Caguán Cultural Arts Center in northern Colombia, Patravadi Theatre in Bangkok, Trade Unions Palace of Culture in Minsk, Belarus, Palace Dar el-Makhzen in the Kasbah, Tangier, Morocco, and Cayman National Cultural Foundation Harquail National Theatre, Grand Cayman in the British West Indies. Rand has performed his solo play in the International Theatre Festival for Peace in Barrancabermeja, Colombia, Kathmandu International Theatre Festival in Nepal, Act Alone Festival in Suðureyri, Iceland, International Intermediality Theatre Conference in Tangier, Morocco, performed and was a Festival judge in the M.E.S.S. International Theatre Festival at the Chamber 55 Theatre, Sarajevo, Bosnia & Herzegovina, WAAE Global Arts Education Summit Athens 2024Colombo International Theater Festival in Sri Lanka, HIGH FEST International Performing Arts Festival in Yerevan, Armenia, International Winter Festival in Sarajevo, Bosnia & Herzegovina, Chevolek International Theatre Festival in Chelyabinsk, Russia, Georgia International Theatre Festival in Tbilisi, Georgia, Slavija International Theatre Festival in Belgrade, Serbia, Lithographeion Theatre, Patras, Greece, and in the Inaugural Harold Clurman Festival of Arts in New York City. Rand has completed five goodwill tours across India, performing his solo play and teaching his master acting workshop at universities and festivals including Rangayana Theatre in Mysore, Manipal University in Jaipur, at Christ University as a Festival judge and performed in Baptizer International Theatre Festival in Bangalore, AddLife Caring Minds Wellness Centre in Kolkata, Jawaharlal Nehru University, Chilsag Chilies Acting Academy, and R.K. Film and TV Media Academy in New Delhi, Anupam Kher's Actor Prepares Academy in Mumbai, University of Calicut, Pondicherry University, Sri Aurobindo Auditorium in Auroville, and appeared in Great Mind at Work, a play by the India playwright, Sachin Gupta, at L'Alliance française de Delhi, performing in Hindi, a language he does not speak.

Rand has performed in LET IT BE ART! across 21 states in the United States including at the Raymond F. Kravis Center for the Performing Arts in West Palm Beach, North Coast Repertory Theatre in Solana Beach, Cyrano's Theatre Company in Anchorage, Invisible Theatre in Tucson, Cape May Stage, Black Mountain Center for the Arts in North Carolina, Norwich Arts Center, Last Frontier Theatre Conference in Valdez, New England Theatre Comference, Southeastern Theatre Conference, Robert Wilson's Watermill Arts Center on Long Island, and in the two-week Logan Festival of Solo Performance at 1st Stage in Tysons, Virginia in repertory with two other solo plays, It Ends with Guinea Pigs with Diana Gitelman and Baron Vaughn:Cycle Breaker. Mark Connelly’s book, The Group Theatre: An Enduring Legacy, features a section on Ronald Rand’s portrayal of Harold Clurman in LET IT BE ART!, exploring Rand’s artistic process and performances.

Rand's other Off-Broadway theater work includes Ma Rainey’s Black Bottom directed by Arthur French at the Classical Theatre of Harlem; all three male leads in Perfect Crime; The Servant of Two Masters directed by Stuart Vaughan, Full Circle by Erich Maria Remarque, and the premiere of an adaptation into a play of Pictures at an Exhibition by Anny Tangelder attended by Princess Christina. He starred as Harry in Luv at The Barnstormers Theatre in Tamworth, New Hampshire, as The Stage Manager in the 75th Anniversary production of Our Town (2013), as Captain Keller in The Miracle Worker (2014), and as Polonius in Hamlet (2015), in Vermont at the Greensboro Arts Alliance Summer Stock Theatre in Greensboro, Vermont. Rand toured for five months across Germany, Switzerland, Austria, Holland, and Luxembourg with American Drama Group Europe as the Fool in King Lear. In the cast was Tom McGowan, who became his roommate on the tour. Rand brought to life Charles Dickens in "An Evening With Charles Dickens Reading A Christmas Carol" at the 8th Annual Dickens Feast at the Tuscumbia Roundhouse in Tuscumbia, Alabama, acting as more than a dozen characters in a new adaptation he created and directed (2018). Rand performed in a new solo play he created, "The Tuscumbia I Know: A Talk by Captain Keller" playing Captain A.H. Keller at the Helen Keller Library as part of The Helen Keller Festival in Tuscumbia, Alabama, Helen Keller's birthplace (2017–2019).

Rand's film appearances include giving a dollar bill to Yoko Ono's character as a homeless woman in the film, Homeless (1989), as an Assistant District Attorney in Family Business (1989), Reversal of Fortune (1990), "The Return of Superfly" (1990), The Hard Way (1991), The Super (1991), Six Degrees of Separation (1993) The Jerky Boys (1995), The Royal Tenenbaums (2001) and Garden State (2004).

Rand was cast by Aaron Russo portraying President Richard Nixon in a scene opposite Eric Roberts in Rude Awakening (1989). He was cast by Peter Bogdanovich as an Executive in a scene opposite Gene Wilder and Richard Pryor in Another You (1991). He was cast by Robert Redford portraying a barfly in a scene opposite Ralph Fiennes and Paul Scofield in Quiz Show (1994) , and he was cast by Mark Steven Johnson as a business magnate in a scene opposite Angelica Huston in When in Rome (2010).

Rand worked in television in the 1990s appearing numerous times on One Life to Live, Another World, As the World Turns, and Guiding Light. Rand portrayed Milton Sterns in A Marriage: Georgia O'Keeffe and Alfred Stieglitz on PBS American Playhouse (1991). Rand portrayed a crime boss as Mercedes Ruehl's husband on Law & Order and was gunned down in Times Square in New York City at the beginning of the episode. Subsequently, his photo appeared on the front page of the New York Post. Rand appeared in several sketches on Saturday Night Live (1983–1993), and as the Judge in a KRS-One video (1987).

== Educator ==
The J. William Fulbright Foreign Scholarship Board and The Bureau of Educational and Cultural Affairs chose Rand as a Fulbright Specialist Scholar during 2021–2025. Rand was also chosen as a Fulbright Specialist Scholar during 2013–2018. Rand has received four Fulbright Awards. In 2013 he became the first Fulbright Specialist Scholar to teach for six weeks at the University of Sarajevo's Academy of Dramatic Arts, University of Tuzla Academy of Dramatic Arts, Mostar Youth Theatre, and the Druga Gimnazija, an IB World School in Sarajevo. In 2015, he became the first Fulbright Specialist Scholar to teach for six weeks at the University of Malaya Cultural Centre Drama Department in Kuala Lumpur, Malaysia. Rand was the first American invited by the Jabatan Kebudayaan dan Kesenian Negara, known as the Malaysian Ministry of Tourism and Culture – National Department for Culture & Arts to teach and perform at Malaysia's JKKN State Theaters in Ipoh, Alor Setar and Kuala Terengganu. In Kuala Lumpur, Rand was invited to teach and perform at the National Arts Culture and Heritage Academy Aswara, Islamic International University Malaysia, Universiti Teknologi MARA, and to teach at the Penang Temple of Fine Arts Academy. In 2017 he became the first Fulbright Specialist Scholar to teach four 7-hour master acting workshops using Constantin Stanislavsky's "Method of Physical Actions" chart for five weeks at the Taller de Teatro in Paysandu, Uruguay, and taught two workshops for ages nine to fifteen at the Family Instituto y Colegio de Inglés in Paysandu, performed in his solo play, and directed an adaptation of the play, Our Town by Thornton Wilder in Spanish with Spanish actors. In 2024, Rand was invited as the first Fulbright Specialist Scholar to teach for six weeks in seven different classes at the Department of Theatre Studies at the University of Patras, Greece. Rand taught his master workshop at the Drama School of Patras, and at the Lithographeion Theatre in Patras.

He was an adjunct professor of Acting and Directing at Pace University in New York City for four years, an Adjunct professor of Acting at Northern Illinois University, and adjunct professor of Theatre History at the University of North Alabama. He has brought his solo play and Art of Transformation Master Acting Workshop to 29 countries and 21 states, including Gonzaga University, Western Washington University, University of Missouri in Columbia, University of Alaska, Syracuse University, Lycoming College, Louisiana State University, University of Zagreb Academy of Dramatic Art, University of Zagreb Academy of Dramatic Art – Zagreb, Croatia, Anadolu University – Eskişehir, Turkey, National and Kapodistrian University of Athens – Athens, Greece, Yerevan State Institute of Theatre and Cinematography – Yerevan, Armenia, University of the Visual and Performing Arts – Colombo, Sri Lanka, 1st KRAKOW FEST International Monodrama Festival - Krakow, Poland, Shota Rustaveli Theatre and Film University – Tbilisi, Georgia, Belarusian State University – Minsk, Belarus, National Theatre of British West Indies – Cayman National Cultural Foundation, IB World School – Sarajevo, Bosnia & Herzegovina, National School of the Arts in Johannesburg, South Africa, Auroville – India, and taught his workshop at the 37th International Festival of University Theatre FITUC, Casablanca, Morocco, when he was the President of the Jury for the festival, in The Business School at the University of North Carolina Asheville, The InterBeing Festival at the Samasati Sanctuary Wellness Center in Weaverville, North Carolina, at several community theaters across America, and at the Joint Personnel Recovery Agency – Fairchild U.S. Air Force Base. In 2026, Rand taught Poetry and Theatre as a Teaching Artist at LEAF Global Arts' summer camp in Asheville.

Rand, an acrylic painter, had originally studied at the Arts Students League in New York City in the late 1970s, gave a talk and painting demonstration on bark for The Shoals Artists Guild at the Kennedy Douglass Center for the Arts, in the Arts Alive Festival, Florence, Alabama in 2019. His artworks were on display in the Annual Art Students League of New York Salon in New York City in 1982, Mostly Blues Exhibit at Kennedy-Douglass Center for the Arts 2019, Florence, Alabama, in the ArtWorks Exhibit at The Tennessee Valley Art Museum in 2018 and 2019 in Tuscumbia, Alabama (2019–2021), in Art Exhibitions at the Flood Gallery Fine Art Center, Asheville, North Carolina in 2026, and in The Art Guild's Art Shows at the Hendersonville County Public Library, North Carolina in 2025.

== Publisher, author, poet, and librettist ==
Rand is the founder, publisher and editor-in-chief of the newspaper, The Soul of the American Actor (founded in 1998), the only printed and online newspaper in America dedicated to the artistic process of the actor and the art of theater. Rand has conducted over 1000 interviews including Alec Baldwin, Theodore Bikel, Lee Blessing, Claire Bloom, Kate Burton, Rita Gam, Andre Gregory, George Grizzard, Charles Grodin, A.R. Gurney, Marcia Gay Harden, Kitty Carlisle Hart, Geoffrey Holder, Celeste Holm, Anjelica Huston, Valerie Harper, Ruben Santiago-Hudson, Judith Ivey, Kevin Kline, Jackie Mason, Terrence Mann, Lloyd Richards, Cliff Robertson, Maureen Stapleton, Peter Weller, and Elie Wiesel. Essays have included those by Stella Adler, Edward Albee, Harold Clurman, Eugenio Barba, William Esper, Jerzy Grotowski, James Earl Jones, Laurence Luckinbill, Sanford Meisner, Arthur Miller, and Lee Strasberg.

Rand is the author of four books. Create! How Extraordinary People Live to Create and Create to Live, Finalist for the Indies Book of the Year Awards for Performing Arts & Music and Finalist in the 12th Annual National Indie Excellence Awards, is a collection of over 100 interviews exploring the creative process of many of the world's most acclaimed actors, actresses, artists, choreographers, composers & lyricists, dancers, directors, educators, musicians, playwrights, poets, singers, and writers of our time, including Carol Burnett, Ellen Burstyn, Martha Carpenter, Dick Cavett, Brian Cox, Ossie Davis, Ruby Dee, Katherine Dunham, Michael Frayn, Kelsey Grammer, Joel Grey, Marvin Hamlisch, Julie Harris, Chaka Khan, Odile Gakire Katese, Everett Raymond Kinstler, Stephen Lang, Jane Maxwell, Patricia Neal, Jerry Orbach, Christopher Plummer, Luise Rainer, Tony Randall, Phylicia Rashad, Chita Rivera, Apriana Taylor, Ben Vereen, Sir Derek Walcott, Robert Wilson, and Eugenia Zukerman.

His second book is Acting Teachers of America with interviews of one hundred influential acting teachers, actors, and directors in America, including Anne Bogart, Steve Buscemi, Olympia Dukakis, Zelda Fichandler, James Gandolfini, Gene Hackman, Michael Howard, William Hurt, Michael Kahn, Milton Katselas, Laura Linney, Edward Norton, Sidney Poitier, and Terry Schreiber.

Rand's third book, Solo Transformation on Stage: A Journey into the Organic Process of the Art of Transformation, includes a foreword by Stephen Lang, Ronald Rand's two-hour transformation into Harold Clurman, Rand's personal experiences with his teachers, Stella Adler, Harold Clurman, and Jerzy Grotowski, life-changing ‘moments of depth’ from some of the world's memorable performers including Cicely Tyson, Paul Robeson, Ira Aldridge, James Earl Jones, Sidney Poitier, John Barrymore, Laurette Taylor, and Marlon Brando, and over twenty interviews including Christopher Plummer, Eve Ensler, Ben Vereen, Billy Crudup, Adrienne Barbeau, Olympia Dukakis, Hershey Felder, Marga Gomez, Spalding Gray, Stephen Lang, Tony Lo Bianco, Laurence Luckinbill, Angelica Page, Elizabeth van Dyke, Jean-Claude van Itallie, and Julie Harris.

Rand's fourth book, The Marsh in May and 30 Poems with 29 Paintings by Ronald Rand, includes an introduction by author/publisher, Lawrence Knorr, and features 29 full-color acrylic paintings by Ronald Rand, and a painting each by playwright Jean-Claude van Itallie, portrait artist Martha Carpenter, and Maribee. As a poet, Rand's poetry appeared in Where the Mind Dwells: Salvation, and in Huntsville Literary Association's magazine, Poem.

Rand created the libretto for a new opera, IBSEN, about the final days of Henrik Ibsen, opera score by German composer, Hartmut von Lieres.

== Director and producer ==
In 2013 Rand became the second U.S. director to direct in the 60-year history of the historic Chamber Theatre 55 in Sarajevo, Bosnia & Herzegovina. Rand was invited by the Director of Chamber Theatre 55, Dragan Jovicic, to direct Murray Schisgal's comedy, LUV, translated by Mirjana Jovicic. The cast included Muhamed Hadzovic, Moamer Kasumovic, and Zana Marjanovic. The set and costumes were designed by Vanja Popovic. The production was performed as part of the theatre repertory for eight sold-out years in repertory, and traveled to Montenegro, Slovenia, Croatia, Serbia, and across Bosnia & Herzegovina, winning awards in state festivals.

Rand became the first American director to direct at the Aras Theatre in Paysandu, Uruguay. He directed an adaptation from the Pulitzer Prize winning play, Our Town by Thornton Wilder translated by Ilse Olivera into Spanish, (a language he does not speak), with actors of Paysandu.

Rand conceived and directed a site-specific interactive performance, "Living Roots: Who We Are" with the students of the Department of Theatre Studies at the University of Patras performing in Greek in the lobby of the University of Patras Conference Center.

Rand produced and co-translated the American premiere of Spanish playwright, Inigo Ramirez de Haro's most controversial play, "We Couldn't Call It What We Wanted To Call It, So We Called It Holy Crap!!" starring Stephen Mo Hanan at La MaMa, E.T.C. directed by Erica Gould in New York City in 2011.

He conceived, produced, and appeared in a staged reading for The Helen Rose Scheuer Jewish Women's Series with Marian Seldes, Elizabeth Ashley, Jayne Atkinson, Libby Skala, David Margulies, and Rosemary Harris at The Jewish Museum in New York City.

As a Producer, Rand presented Karen Etervoich in Cheer from Chawton: A Jane Austen Family Theatrical at the Judith Anderson Theatre on Theatre Row in New York City. At the Players in New York City, he produced several solo plays including Libby Skala in LiLiA!, Janis Stevens in Vivien, An Evening with Vijay Tendulkar, a staged reading of Ty Jones' Emancipation, Vinie Burrows in Rose McClendon: Harlem's Gift to Broadway, John Rothman as H.L. Mencken, Andrea Reese in Cirque Jacqueline. In 2003, Rand presented An Evening of Exceptional Women Poets with Ruby Dee, Irene O'Garden, Hasna Muhammad Davis and Sandy Rochelle, attended by Ossie Davis.

In 2008, Rand co-produced with La Mama Experimental Theatre Club, a benefit performance of Jean-Claude van Itallie’s The Tibetan Book of the Dead, or How Not To Do It Again with music by Steve Gorn in The Ellen Stewart Theatre to benefit the Shantigar Foundation. A silent art auction art was held by friends of Shantigar and included artwork by Rand, Gwen Fabricant, Mary Frank, Betsy von Furstenburg, Deb Katz, and Robert Wilson.

In 2008, Rand co-produced with CUNY’s Martin E. Segal Theatre-Graduate Center a day-long event, "The Theatre of Jean-Claude van Itallie," celebrating the plays and work of the playwright. Included was a conversation between van-Itallie and William Coco, screenings of Jean-Claude van Itallie in War, Sex and Dreams and Joseph Chaikin in Struck Dumb. Rand, Brian Murray, Laila Robins, Angelica Torn, Ruth Maleczech, Rosemary Quinn, and Peter Goldfarb participated in readings from van Itallie's works including America Hurrah, The Serpent, Light, Bag Lady, the musical MILA with a performance by Lois Walden, and The Tibetan Book of the Dead, or How Not To Do It Again with Court Dorsey, Kermit Dunkelberg, and Susan Thompson.

In 2011, Rand directed and appeared in Voices from Chernobyl: A Meltdown from Chernobyl, The Oral History of a Nuclear Disaster by Svetlana Alexievich, a dramatic adaptation by Spencer Smith with Frances Crowe, Ruth Hooke, Sister Jane Morrissey, and Jean-Claude van Itallie across northern New England at churches and meeting houses.

In 2012, Rand co-produced an all-day program, The Group Theatre & How it Transformed American Culture, with the Martin E. Segal Theatre Center at CUNY Graduate Center in the Elebash Hall in New York City celebrating the legacies of the Group Theatre of the 1930s, co-curated by Rand and Mel Gordon. The event included panel discussions with Robert Ellerman, John Strasberg, and Ellen Adler; dramatic readings by Rand, Joanna Rotte, Mel Gordon, Rita Fredricks, Sabra Jones, Tom Oppenheim, Elizabeth Parrish, Penny Templeton, Gene Terruso, and Rand with Laila Robins, and Fritz Weaver reading a scene from Rand’s play, The Group! about the life of the Group Theatre. Rand produced a Tribute honoring Robert Whitehead and Harold Clurman for their legendary theatrical collaboration at the Stella Adler Studio of Acting, attended by Robert Whitehead, Zoe Caldwell, Eli Wallach, Ellen Adler, and Gene Saks. Rand also produced a Tribute to film and television historian and critic Steven H. Scheuer at the Stella Adler Studio of Acting, attended by Steven H. Scheuer.

In 2013, Rand created and moderated a Drama Desk Panel Event, The Art of Storytelling, at Sardi's Restaurant in New York City, interviewing Bertie Carvel, Jayne Houdyshell, Kristine Nielsen, and David Hyde-Pierce. In 2026, Rand conceived, directed and performed his poetry in Ubuntu A Poetry & Musical Celebration: I Am Because We Are! at the Center for Spiritual Living Asheville with music created by Adama Dembele, Imani White, David Washington, and Rev. Dr. Suzi Schadle.
