= Ed Metzger =

American actor and writer (born 1936)

- Born: January 23, 1936 (age 90); Brooklyn, New York, US
- Occupations: Actor, writer
- Known for: Portrayal of Albert Einstein on stage
- Spouse: Layla Gelff

Edward Metzger (born January 23, 1936) is an American actor and writer. Metzger is known for portrayals of famous men in history. He has portrayed Albert Einstein live on stage for over 30 years in his one-man show, Albert Einstein: The Practical Bohemian. He also portrayed Ernest Hemingway in his live on stage performances of Hemingway: On The Edge. He researched and wrote both one-man stage shows together with his wife, Laya Gelff Metzger.

Ed Metzger studied with Lee Strasberg at the Actors Studio in New York, and had roles in a number of movies: Reflections in a Golden Eye, Dog Day Afternoon, Car Wash, and Pups.

Ed Metzger also appeared with Al Pacino on stage in Bertolt Brecht's gangster play, The Resistible Rise of Arturo Ui, at Joe Papp's New York Shakespeare Festival. On television, he had roles in Chris Rock's comedy series, Everybody Hates Chris and Kojak. He had a guest appearance on The Super Mario Bros. Super Show! as George Washington and Einstein.

Ed Metzger played Theodore Roosevelt in the 2008 movie The Curious Case of Benjamin Button.

== Filmography ==
Year	Title	Role	Notes
1967	Reflections in a Golden Eye	Pvt. Frank Brian	
1975	Dog Day Afternoon	Sgt. Murray	Uncredited
1976	Car Wash	Arresting Cop	
1995	Joe's Rotten World	Albert Einstein	
1999	Pups	Mr. Edwards	
2008	The Curious Case of Benjamin Button	Teddy Roosevelt	
2009	Watchmen	Prof. Albert Einstein	Uncredited
2012	FDR: American Badass!	Albert Einstein	
2021	American Dream	Dimitri Yerevanski	
