= Paula Strasberg =

American actress (1909–1966)

- Born: Pearl Miller; March 8, 1909; New York City, U.S.
- Died: April 29, 1966 (aged 57); New York City, U.S.
- Other name: Pauline Miller
- Occupations: Actress, acting coach
- Spouse(s): Harry Stein (m. 1929; div. 1935) Lee Strasberg (m. 1935)
- Children: Susan Strasberg; John Strasberg

Paula Strasberg (born Pearl Miller; March 8, 1909 – April 29, 1966) was an American stage actress. She became actor and teacher Lee Strasberg's second wife and mother of actors John and Susan Strasberg, as well as Marilyn Monroe's acting coach and confidante.

== Career ==
Born Pearl Miller to a Jewish family, she made her debut on Broadway in 1927, appearing in The Cradle Song. Two years later, she married her first husband, Harry Stein, whom she divorced in 1935. The union was childless. She appeared in more than 20 stage roles until Me and Molly in 1948. A life member of the Actors Studio, she married Lee Strasberg in 1935, just days after her first marriage ended.

She was later blacklisted for her membership in the American Communist Party, although her husband was not a member and suffered no adverse effects on his career. She went on to become Marilyn Monroe's acting coach and confidante until Monroe's death in 1962, supplanting Natasha Lytess. In the 2011 film, My Week With Marilyn, Strasberg is played by Zoe Wanamaker.

== Personal life ==
Her children, Susan Strasberg (1938–1999) and John Strasberg (born 1941), were also actors. Susan described her mother as a "combination delicatessen, pharmacist, Jewish mother".

== Death ==
Paula Strasberg died of bone marrow cancer at Beth Israel Hospital in Manhattan on April 29, 1966, aged 57, and is interred at Westchester Hills Cemetery in Hastings-on-Hudson, Westchester County, New York.
