= Hyman Roth =

Fictional character in the film The Godfather Part II

- Lee Strasberg portraying Hyman Roth
- First appearance: The Godfather Part II
- Last appearance: The Godfather II (video game)
- Created by: Mario Puzo
- Portrayed by: Lee Strasberg

In-universe information
- Nickname: "Johnny Lips"
- Occupation: Mob boss, casino-owner, financier, rum runner (formerly)
- Spouse: Marcia Roth (m. 1950)
- Relatives: Sam Roth (brother)
- Religion: Judaism

Hyman Roth (né Suchowsky) is a fictional character and the main antagonist in the 1974 film The Godfather Part II. He is also a minor character in the 2004 novel The Godfather Returns. Roth is a Jewish mobster and investor, and a business partner of Vito Corleone and later his son Michael Corleone. He is based on notorious mobster and gambling kingpin Meyer Lansky. It was Al Pacino who suggested Lee Strasberg, his former acting teacher, for the role.

== Character overview ==
Roth's background is supplied in a deleted scene in The Godfather Part II. In this scene, set in Little Italy, New York, in the early 1920s, he is working as a car mechanic. He is noticed by Peter Clemenza, who has been calling him "Johnny Lips". Clemenza introduces him to his friend Vito Corleone, who suggests that he change his name, which was originally Hyman Suchowsky. When Vito asks him whom he admires, Suchowsky says Arnold Rothstein, for having fixed the 1919 World Series; accordingly, he changes his last name to Roth.

Dialogue later in the film explains that Roth has worked diligently with the Corleone family ever since. During Prohibition, he helped the Corleones enter the bootlegging trade by setting up a molasses-smuggling operation between Havana and Canada. He was also a close friend and ally of fellow Jewish gangster Moe Greene, the "inventor" of Las Vegas. While Roth admits it would have been wrong to show anger and vengeance after Greene's death, as well as admitting that Greene pushed the limit too often, he is disappointed the famous city has nothing to remember him by. Corleone family caporegime Frank Pentangeli later tells Michael that while Vito Corleone grew to like and respect Roth during their four decades of doing business, the elder Corleone never trusted Roth.

== The Godfather Part II ==
By the timeline of this film, Roth is based in Miami. Though in poor health, he is extremely wealthy, having made a fortune by running his own organized crime outfit, assisted by his right-hand man, Sicilian Johnny Ola. Roth forms a partnership with Michael Corleone for a profitable business enterprise with the corrupt Cuban government of Fulgencio Batista and a number of major American corporations to take control of a casino in Reno. Roth secretly plans to assassinate Michael, partly to avenge Moe Greene's murder (as depicted in The Godfather). Roth instructs Ola to befriend Michael's brother Fredo, who provides Ola (and Roth) information about Michael that enables them to make an attempt on his life.

Michael quickly realizes that Roth ordered the hit. Remembering his father's advice to "keep your friends close, but your enemies closer", he maintains a good business relationship with Roth. Michael also suspects a mole within the Corleone family aided Roth, and needs time to uncover his identity.

On New Year's Eve 1958, the last night of Batista's rule, Michael orders Roth killed, confiding to Fredo that Roth will not see the New Year. Michael's bodyguard Bussetta attempts to assassinate Roth, who has been recuperating in a hospital, by smothering him with a pillow. However, this assassination attempt is thwarted by Cuban soldiers who enter the hospital ward and open fire on Bussetta, killing him instead. Moments later, Fidel Castro's army enters the city, overthrowing the Batista regime and further ruining Michael's plans, as well as those of Roth, who had intended to pass ownership of his Cuban casinos to various Mafia heads, with Michael gaining control of the Capri.

Shortly after the Cuban fiasco, the U.S. Senate begins hearings on organized crime. To eliminate Michael as a competitor, Roth manipulates Frank Pentangeli into testifying against Michael by having the Rosato brothers, two small-time hoods, attempt to kill Pentangeli. He survives and, believing Michael ordered the attack, agrees to testify against the Corleone family at a Senate hearing. The hearing is really a set piece arranged by Roth in hopes of removing Michael from the scene; the Senate committee's chief counsel is on Roth's payroll. As a counter-move, Michael has Pentangeli's brother, Vincenzo, flown in from Sicily to subtly coerce Pentangeli into silence via his brother's presence, which apparently made Pentangeli feel ashamed of nearly breaking the old world's code of honor, thus destroying the government's case against Michael.

Roth is last seen at the Miami airport, where he publicly states that he wishes to retire and live in Israel under the Law of Return. His request (like that of the real-life Meyer Lansky) is rejected by the Israeli High Court, reportedly due to his criminal ties. Michael arranges to have Roth killed at the airport where he is about to be taken into U.S. federal custody. Minutes after disembarking the plane, he is fatally shot by Michael's caporegime Rocco Lampone, posing as a reporter. Rocco himself is killed by federal agents as he tries to escape.

Roth's quote "We're bigger than U.S. Steel", when boasting how much more successful organized crime is compared with this multinational, was based on a similar quote by Meyer Lansky.
