= Brad Sherrill =

American actor

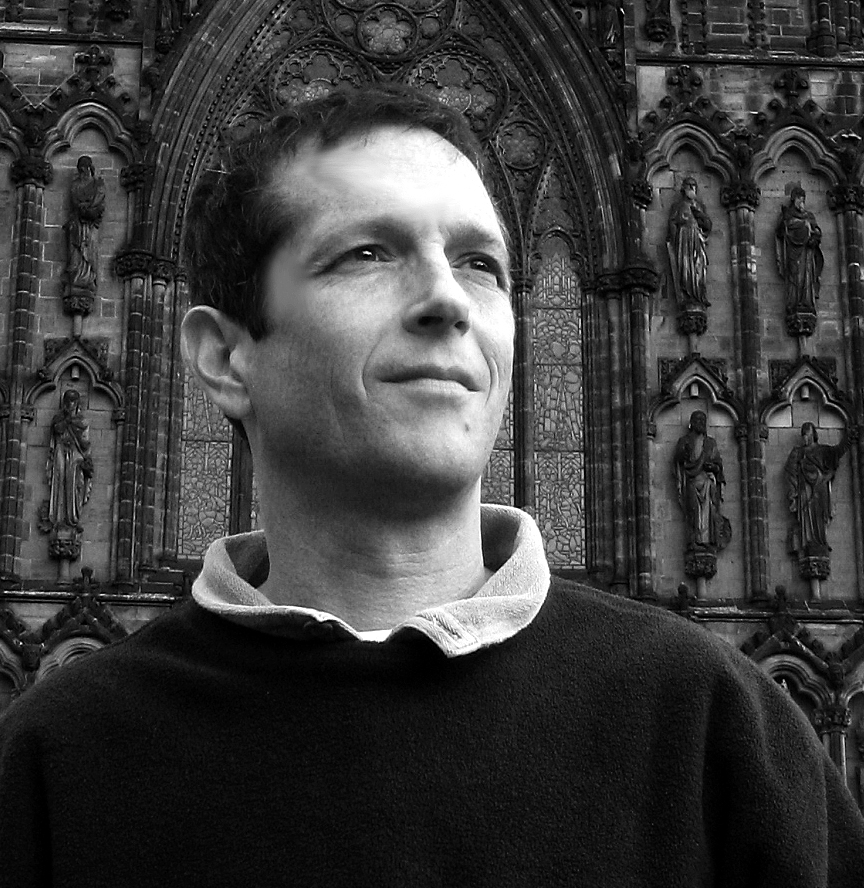
Brad Sherrill

Brad Sherrill (born 20th century) is an American stage actor. Atlanta-based, he gained national recognition beginning in 2001 with his off-Broadway and subsequent national touring performance of The Gospel of John. Since 2001, Sherrill's one-person live performance of the fourth New Testament gospel (which Sherrill memorized and performs in its 20,000 word entirety) has been presented over 600 times in cathedrals, churches and professional theaters across the United States, Canada and Europe (including a six-week run off-Broadway at New York City’s historic Lamb’s Theatre in 2003.) Other professional theater runs of The Gospel of John include Chicago (at the Royal George Theatre, 2007), Washington D.C. (at Theater Alliance, 2002) , Toronto (at Brookstone Theatre, 2005) and Atlanta (at Theatre in the Square, 2001.)

At The Gospel of John's Washington, D.C., premiere in 2002, The Washington Post stated: “It's not just the intensity of Sherrill's performance that…brings the story home. It's also the simple stroke of genius in performing the entire gospel, unadapted, as drama. Passion, longing, envy, greed, ambition, intrigue and betrayal -- it's all here, and it is riveting.”

Sherrill has premiered other biblical works in professional theaters during recent years including Prophets, based on the Old Testament texts of Isaiah and Jeremiah (produced by Georgia Shakespeare Co., Atlanta, 2010) and Red Letter Jesus based on the New Testament gospels of Matthew, Mark and Luke (produced by Theatre in the Square, Atlanta, 2012.) Both performances are presented with extensive, original video presentations produced on location throughout the Middle East.

Sherrill was an Atlanta-based professional theater actor for 15 years before developing his one-person performances.
