= Patrick Combs =

American author and speaker

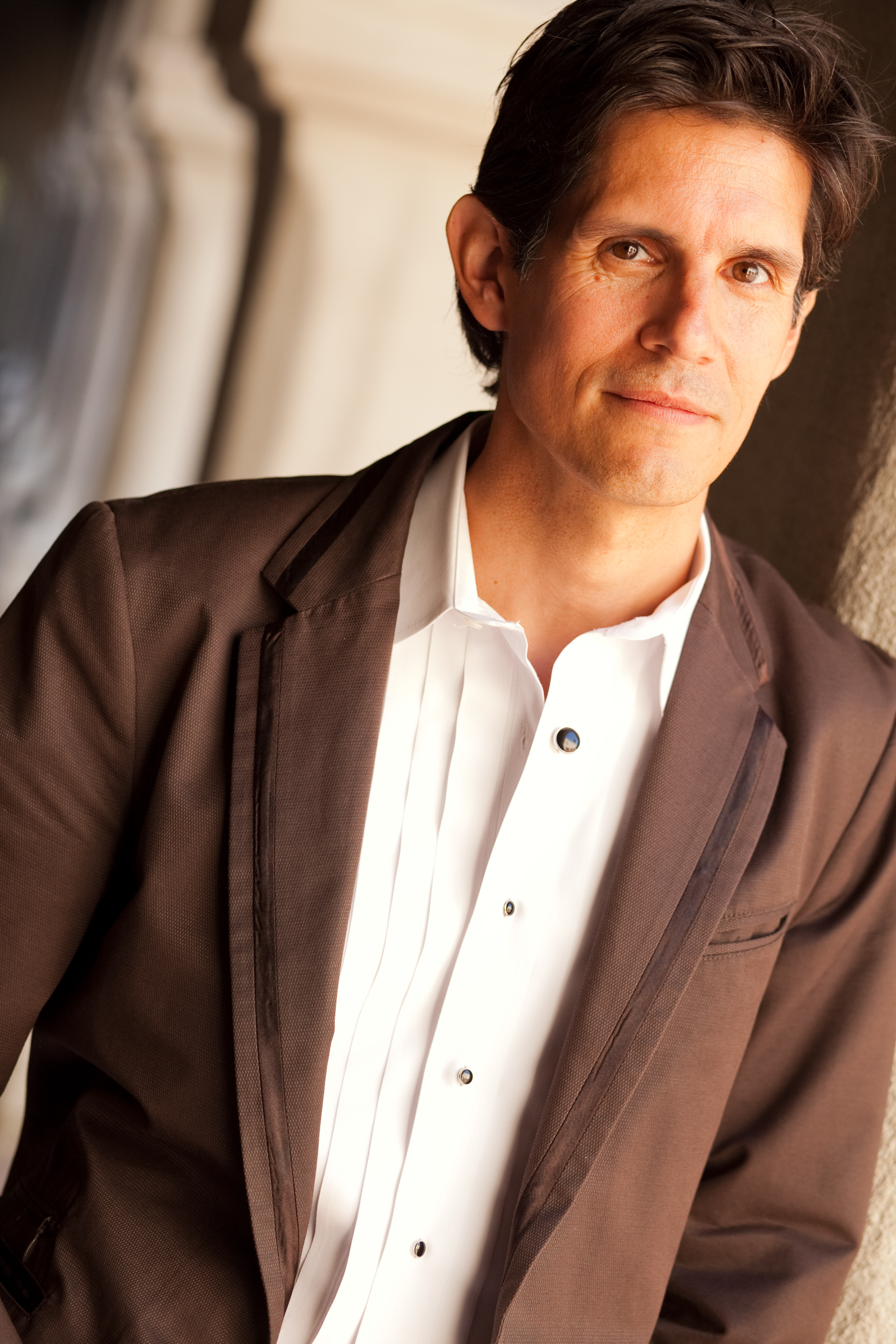
- Patrick Combs in 2010
- Born: July 5, 1966 (age 60); Bend, Oregon
- Occupations: Author, Inspirational speaker
- Writing career
- Notable work: (book) Man 1 Bank 0

Patrick Combs (born July 5, 1966) is an American author and speaker. He is the author of Major in Success and Man 1 Bank 0 which was adapted into a one-man live stage show that has toured the United States and Europe. Combs has performed the show to sold-out audiences in Ireland and on Broadway.

Combs is a public speaker.

As an occasional reporter and commentator, Combs has appeared on television programs, talk shows and network specials, as well as the cover of the Harlequin Romance novel The Valentine Gift. Combs also made headlines when at age 21 he delivered a stranger's baby on a sidewalk in San Francisco without any previous medical training

== Early life and education ==
Combs was raised in Bend, Oregon by a single mother with his older brother Mike Combs. His mother was a nurse until she lost her job after a back injury. The family lived in poverty in a trailer on a single income with support in part by a local church. Combs would take odd jobs to help, including picking strawberries and running a daily paper route. He attended Lewis & Clark College starting in 1984, and graduated San Francisco State University in 1989 with a Bachelor of Arts.

At 26, he left his corporate job to assist students and tested videogames for Electronic Arts to support himself. By 28, he was a published author, a college speaker, and had a Fortune 100 sponsorship to visit the top 100 schools in America.

== Author ==
In 1992 Combs began writing his first book Major in Success. The book was published by Ten Speed Press and is distributed by Random House.

As a companion to his live one-man stage show, Man 1 Bank 0, in 2010 Combs wrote a novelization of it.

== Speaker ==
Combs has made speeches in the United States and abroad regarding a variety of motivational topics.

== Performer ==
Combs' one-man show, Man 1 Bank 0 has played sold-out runs at HBO's 2004 U.S. Comedy Arts Festival held in Aspen, at the Spoleto Festival in Charleston (where it garnered "Critic's Choice"), in Winnipeg, and at the Comedy Central Stage in Los Angeles. The show won "Best of Fest" at the San Francisco Fringe where it was awarded "Best Solo Comedy," and was an official selection of the New Zealand International Comedy Festival and an official selection of the Just For Laughs Festival in Montreal. The show sold out in New York during its off-Broadway run at the Lambs Theatre in summer 2015. In 2012 he debuted his one-man show entitled Foolhardy at the Orlando Fringe

== Media personality ==
Combs has appeared on Hard Copy and Real TV. He has also appeared on such talk shows as The View, Donahue, ABC's World News Tonight, NBC Nightly News, “Coast to Coast AM” with Art Bell, Good Morning America, Montel Williams and The Late Show.

== Published work ==
- Major in Success, Ten Speed Press, 1994
- Gearing Up (Inside & Out) for a Great Life: A Smart Guide for High School, Light Matrix Books, 2003
- Man 1 Bank 0, Art Helix, October 18, 2011
