= Albert Einstein: The Practical Bohemian =

Play written by Ed Metzger

Albert Einstein: The Practical Bohemian is a stage play that is the only show officially endorsed by the Einstein family. A quote from Albert Einstein's first cousin said that the family "felt as though they were in the presence of their dear cousin Albert." The one-man show opened in 1978 written and performed by actor-writer Ed Metzger in Los Angeles, California.

Since that time, he has presented it throughout the world, including the Kennedy Center in Washington, D.C. The show, co-written by Metzger's wife Laya Gelff, is a portrayal about the man as well as the scientist, creating a portrait of one of the 20th Century's greatest minds, but who harbored dreams of being a solo violinist. The show highlights the curiosity that drove Einstein to seek answers to the mysteries of the universe. It shows his struggle as a pacifist, threatened by antisemitism and forced to flee Germany, and eventually disappointed that his scientific discoveries were used in the creation of nuclear weapons.
