= Hemingway: On the Edge =

Play written by Ed Metzger

Hemingway: On the Edge is a one-man show about the life of Ernest Hemingway performed since 1987 by Ed Metzger, and is written by Metzger and his wife Laya Gelff-Metzger.
