= John Strasberg =

American actor

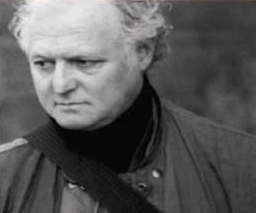
- Born: John Carl Strasberg; May 20, 1941 (age 85); New York City, U.S.
- Occupations: Actor, director, acting teacher, writer
- Years active: 1959–present
- Parent(s): Lee Strasberg; Paula Strasberg
- Relatives: Susan Strasberg (sister)
- Website: johnstrasbergstudios.org

John Strasberg (born May 20, 1941) is the son of Lee and Paula Strasberg of the Actors Studio, and brother of actress Susan Strasberg.

== Background and career ==
John Strasberg is an American actor, director, teacher and writer, the son of Lee Strasberg and Paula Strasberg and the brother of actress, writer Susan Strasberg.

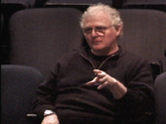
John Strasberg teaching NY acting class

After graduating from the Bronx High School of Science in 1958, he spent a year at the University of Wisconsin before beginning to study acting with his father. His professional career began in 1960 as an Assistant Stage Manager at the New York City Center, and shortly after, he began his acting career off-Broadway in Five Evenings. He began teaching in 1964, when his father was ill. His career has remained multi-faceted throughout his life. He acted and stage managed during the three years of the existence of The Actors Studio Theater, acting in Marathon ’33, and stage managing Dynamite Tonight, Marathon ’33, and Blues for Mr. Charlie, during which he became one of the youngest Production Stage Managers on Broadway, and his father's production of The Three Sisters.

He taught acting at Columbia Pictures from 1966 to 1968, and acted in several television shows and films. He returned to New York to teach at his father's school Lee Strasberg Theatre and Film Institute in 1969. In 1971 he taught a workshop at the National Film Board of Canada. After returning to New York he acted in the Circle Repertory Company's production of Lanford Wilson’s The Mound Builders.

He became Executive Director of The Lee Strasberg Theater Institute in 1975. After leaving the Institute in 1977 he taught privately and produced a play Slugger directed by Marshall W. Mason. In 1979 he founded John Strasberg's The Real Stage in New York City. In 1980 he began teaching and directing in Europe, primarily in France and Spain, where he directed productions of William Shakespeare, Aristophanes, Henrik Ibsen, Eugene O'Neill, Luigi Pirandello among many other writers. Several of these productions won awards. Under Founder and Producing Artistic Director Sabra Jones, he was also Co-Artistic Director of The Mirror Repertory Company, where Geraldine Page was the Artist-in-Residence. Strasberg directed The Mirror's productions of Paradise Lost by Clifford Odets, Inheritors by Susan Glaspell, Joan of Lorraine by Maxwell Anderson, Vivat! Vivat Regina! by Robert Bolt, and Rain by John Colton.

In 1985 he began living and working in Europe. In 1996 he returned to New York upon publication of his book on acting Accidentally On Purpose: A Memoir on Life, Acting, and the Nine Natural Laws of Creativity, an award-winning documentary of the same name was also created.

He created John Strasberg Studios, an International Center for Creative Development and Theater Research. In 2005 he created The Accidental Repertory Theater, which in 2011 produced several plays which he wrote and directed: Playing House, a modern play inspired by Ibsen's A Doll's House, and Adams' Apples, a modern play inspired by Chekhov's The Cherry Orchard. Strasberg is a life member of The Actors Studio.
