= Carrie Nation House =

Carrie Nation House or Carry A. Nation House may refer to homes of Carrie Nation, who was also known as Carry A. Nation, including:

- Carrie Nation House (Kansas), in Medicine Lodge, Kansas, also known as Carry A. Nation House (and listed on the NRHP as that)
- Carry A. Nation House (Kentucky), in Lancaster, Kentucky
