= Melissa Ramski =

Singer-songwriter

- Born: Melissa Rachel Ramski; March 25, 1991 (age 34); Fort Pierce, Florida, United States
- Origin: Nashville, Tennessee, United States
- Genres: Country
- Occupation: Singer-songwriter
- Instruments: Vocals, Acoustic Guitar
- Labels: Lamon Records, N.E.W.R
- Website: www.melissaramski.com

Melissa Ramski is a country singer-songwriter from Nashville, Tennessee. Since 2008 Ramski has been producing commercially available music and films. She was Awarded "The Best Female Solo" award at the Indie Ville Awards 2015. She was Awarded "The Artist of The Year" award at the Indie Ville Awards 2017. She was awarded "Entertainer Of The Year" award at LOZ Radio 2017.

== Early life ==
Melissa Rachel Ramski was born on March 25, 1991, in Fort Pierce, Florida. She is the daughter of David and Nancy Ramski and has an older sister Mindy. She was introduced to show business by chance, when her mum took her to have her photo taken at Walmart when she was only 18 months old. The store liked the photo of Ramski in a box so much that Walmart requested to use it for print ads for Walmart Photography across Texas. From age 5 she started to sing and perform at various events, such as weddings, barbecues, fairs and concerts. On December 3, 2005, Ramski performed for the Wilmore Opry Christmas Show at the Heritage Center near Medicine Lodge, Kansas. The Wilmore Opry is owned by Martina Mcbride's parents.

== Career ==
In 2008, Ramski performed in a duo act with her sister. The act was known as The Ramskis and the two performed together until 2010. In 2010, Ramski's song "Winter Wonderland" was nominated for the CMA and Grammy award Country/Pop Recording Artist short-list. Ramski also released her first single "Lost In Your Eyes". Ramski released two singles in 2015, she also won the Indie Ville Award for 'Best Female Solo'. In 2017 Ramski signed to a new record label, Nashville Entertainment Weekly Recordings (N.E.W.R].

Ramski has also been actively involved in the film industry. In 2008 Ramski starred as Karis McConnell in "Lost Treasure Trail". Since then she has been acting lead roles, performing music for animations and helping out with post production on a number of local projects. In 2015 Ramski was nominated for and won "The Best Female Solo" at the Indie Ville Awards.

== Filmography ==
Title	Role	Year	Type of film
Tuff Kookooshka	Post production	2014	TV show
Kids Take Nashville		2014	TV movie
It's a Merry Christmas When Pigs Can Fly	Post production	2014	Animated Movie
Jimmy Paul: The Pug Tooth Fairy	Plays 'ZaZa'	2010	Animated Movie
Special Red Dress	Soundtrack production	2010	Animated Movie
Careful What You Wish For	Plays 'Veronica' Soundtrack producer	2010	Short
Lost Treasure Trail	Plays 'Karis McConnell'	2008	Short
Nobody Listens	Make-up artist	2008	Short

== Discography ==
Released as solo artist Melissa Ramski
Title	Release date
Masquerade (Single)	May 1, 2017 (Confirmed date)
Lace & Diamond's (Single) (co-written by Eric Fleischauer)	June 8, 2015
Keep Dreamin (Single) (co-written by Eric Fleischauer)	Jan 30, 20145

Released as 'The Ramskis' with 'Mindy' Ramski
Title	Release date
Lost in your eyes	2010
