= Dorothy Patten =

American theatre producer

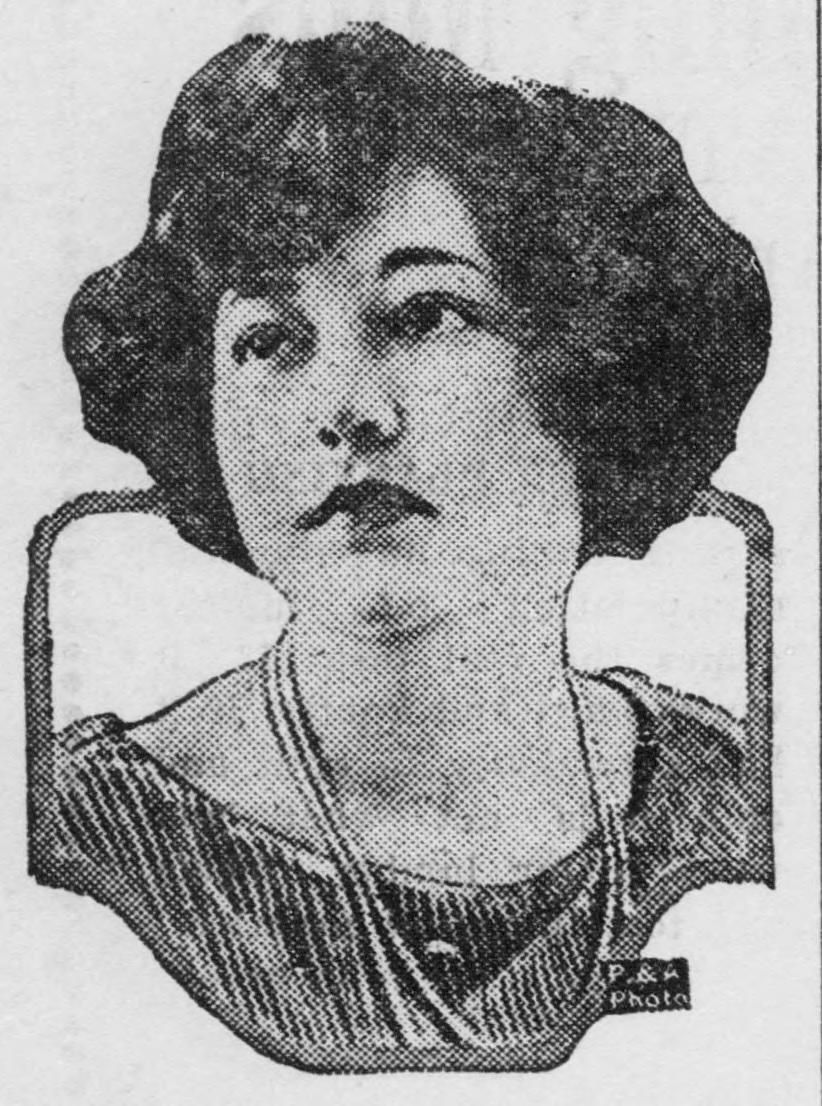
- Patten in 1923
- Born: January 24, 1905; Chattanooga, Tennessee, US
- Died: April 11, 1975 (aged 70); Westhampton Beach, New York, US
- Occupations: theatre actor; theatre producer; producer of The Group Theatre in New York
- Years active: 1929-1960s
- Partner(s): Cheryl Crawford (c. 1930 - c. 1937); Cecelia McMahon (c.1939 - her death)

Dorothy Patten (January 24, 1905 – April 11, 1975) was an American theatre producer and actress.

== Biography ==
Born in Chattanooga, Tennessee to a wealthy family, Patten rejected the traditional role of a Southern socialite and hostess and set out for a life on the stage. Following the death of her mother in 1927, she left for New York City and attended the American Academy of Dramatic Arts, getting her first break on the stage in Elizabeth the Queen in 1929.

Patten was linked romantically with actress Cheryl Crawford in the 1930s, who, together with Harold Clurman and Lee Strasberg, formed The Group Theatre in 1931. Patten financed several of the group's shows, and also acted in several of them. Patten and Crawford lived together and visited each other's family homes in Chattanooga and Akron.

Patten returned to Chattanooga during WWII to assist her father with his work. After his death, she donated their family home to the University of Tennessee at Chattanooga, and became a philanthropist to arts and theatre organizations in Chattanooga. The University's "Patten Performances", funded by her grant and named for her, have been ongoing for over thirty years. As of 2009, it was reported that they had brought theatre performances to over 100,000 people in Chattanooga and earned almost one million dollars for the University.

After the break-up of her relationship with Crawford circa 1937, Patten became linked to Cecelia McMahon, who became her lifelong companion. Patten died in New York in 1975.

== Notable productions ==
- Elizabeth the Queen
- Big Night
- Anastasia
- The Greatest Show on Earth
- Men in White
- Subway Express
- Success Story
- Waiting for Lefty
- The House of Connelly
