= Fanny Belle DeKnight =

American actress (1869–1950)

- Fanny Belle DeKnight
- Born: Fannie Belle Johnson; May 22, 1869; Richmond, Virginia, U.S.
- Died: April 28, 1950 (aged 80); Richmond, Virginia, U.S.
- Other name: Fanny De Knight
- Occupation: Actress

Fanny Belle DeKnight (May 22, 1869 – April 28, 1950) was an actress in the United States who worked on stage and films in the 1920s and 1930s. She was most well known for her role as the mammy in the 1929 musical film Hallelujah by King Vidor.

== Career ==
Born Fannie Belle Johnson in Richmond, Virginia, she married and toured with piano player Samuel Knight throughout the 1890's, with DeKnight acting as a comedic reciter. She later advertised herself as a dramatic and dialect reader in The Crisis in 1913.

She was personally selected for the 1929 musical film Hallelujah by King Vidor because he needed someone to fit the role of a mammy in the film. She also co-starred in the 1932 short musical film A Rhapsody in Black and Blue with Sidney Easton, with both of them being uncredited for their primary roles.

== Theater ==
- Taboo (1922) as Mammy Dorcas
- Lulu Belle as Mrs. Frisbie
- The House of Connelly (1932)
- Carry Nation (1932) as Aunt Judy

== Filmography ==
- Hallelujah (1929) as Mammy Johnson
- A Rhapsody in Black and Blue (1932)
