= The House of Connelly =

- Original language: English
- Written by: Paul Green
- Genre: Drama
- Setting: field on Connelly plantation, dining room and ruined garden of Connelly Hall

Premiere
- Date: September 28, 1931
- Place: Martin Beck Theatre; Mansfield Theatre; New York City, New York

The House of Connelly is a 1931 Broadway two-act drama written by Paul Green, produced by the Group Theatre in association with The Theatre Guild and staged by Lee Strasberg and Cheryl Crawford. It ran for 91 performances from September 28, 1931 to November 14, 1931 at the Martin Beck Theatre and then from November 16, 1931 to January 2, 1932 at the Mansfield Theatre. It was the inaugural production of the Group Theatre.

It was adapted into the 1934 film Carolina directed by Henry King and starring Janet Gaynor, Lionel Barrymore and Robert Young.

== Cast ==
- Stella Adler as Geraldine Connelly
- Eunice Stoddard as Evelyn Connelly
- Morris Carnovsky as Robert Connelly
- Franchot Tone as Will Connelly
- Phoebe Brand as Serenader
- J. Edward Bromberg as Duffy
- William Challee as Jodie and as Serenader
- Walter Coy as Charlie and as Serenader
- Lewis Leverett as Serenader
- Robert Lewis as Alf and as Serenader
- Rose McClendon as Big Sue
- Mary Morris as Mrs. Connelly
- Ruth Nelson as Essie
- Clifford Odets as Reuben and as Serenader
- Art Smith as Jesse Tate
- Margaret Barker as Patsy Tate
- Fanny De Knight as Big Sis
- Virginia Farmer as Serenader
- Sylvia Feningston as Serenader
- Friendly Ford as Isaac and as Serenader
- Gerrit Kraber as Tyler and as Serenader
- Gertrude Maynard as Serenader
- Paula Miller as Serenader
- Dorothy Patten as Virginia Buchanan
- Herbert Ratner as Henry
- Philip Robinson as Ransom and as Serenader
- Clement Wilenchick as Alec and as Serenader
