= Cheryl Crawford =

American actress (1902–1986)

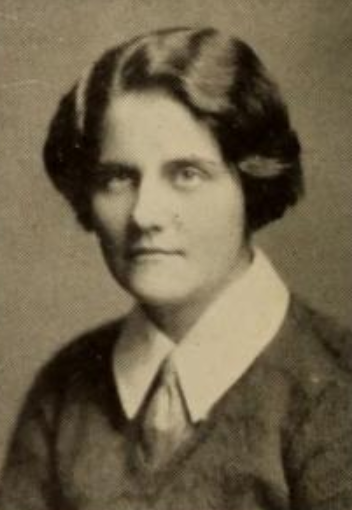
- Cheryl Crawford, from the 1925 Smith College yearbook
- Born: September 24, 1902; Akron, Ohio, US
- Died: October 7, 1986 (Aged 84); New York City, US
- Occupations: Theatre director; Theatre producer; Studio co-founder (of the Actors Studio)
- Years active: 1926–1983
- Partners: Dorothy Patten (c.1930–c.1937); Ruth Norman (c.1944–c.1977)

Cheryl Crawford (September 24, 1902 – October 7, 1986) was an American theatre producer and director.

== Biography ==
Born in Akron, Ohio, Crawford majored in drama at Smith College. Following graduation in 1925, she moved to New York City and enrolled at the Theatre Guild's school. By then she knew that she did not want to pursue an acting career, but saw no other way to gain access to the organization producing the highest quality theatre of its time. Finishing her training in 1927, she was hired by Theresa Helburn, the Guild's Executive Director, as a casting secretary. She then worked her way through various backstage jobs, including assistant stage manager, to assistant to the “Board of Managers,” an important administrative job. While working at the Guild, she met Harold Clurman and Lee Strasberg who had also been working there as play reader and actor, respectively. She was impressed with these two young men and joined their animated discussions about the need for a radically new form of American theatre.

In 1930 Crawford urged Clurman to start giving semi-public talks to groups of like-minded actors. After he followed her suggestion and the talks attracted more people than could fit in Clurman's apartment, Crawford arranged for the use of a showroom at the Steinway Piano Company. In 1931, Crawford, Clurman and Strasberg announced the formation of The Group Theatre and invited 28 young actors who had been attending Clurman's talks to join them for a twelve-week-long summer of training and rehearsal at Brookfield Center, Connecticut.

Crawford had a major role in selecting the early plays produced by The Group, beginning with their first one, The House of Connelly by North Carolina playwright Paul Green, whom she later introduced to composer Kurt Weill. She encouraged their subsequent collaboration, Weill's first American project, the musical Johnny Johnson, was the last production she worked on before resigning from The Group Theatre in 1937 to become an independent producer.

Crawford was influential in the early careers of such actors as Helen Hayes, Bojangles Robinson, Mary Martin, Ethel Barrymore, Ingrid Bergman, Tallulah Bankhead, and Paul Robeson, among many others. In 1946, she and Eva Le Gallienne founded the American Repertory Theatre. In 1947, together with former Group Theatre members Elia Kazan and Robert Lewis, she founded the Actors Studio, which trained Marlon Brando, James Dean, Paul Newman, Joanne Woodward, Rip Torn, Geraldine Page, Marilyn Monroe, Al Pacino, Robert De Niro, Dustin Hoffman, Steve McQueen, Martin Landau, Shelley Winters, Jane Fonda, Ellen Burstyn, Harvey Keitel, Jack Nicholson, John Astin, and many more. Former partner Strasberg joined them as artistic director in 1951.

Crawford is a member of the American Theater Hall of Fame, earning induction in 1979.

== Personal life ==
Crawford was a lesbian and was linked romantically with her fellow Group Theatre actress Dorothy Patten, with whom she lived for several years in the 1930s. Patten had also financed several of the group's shows. Patten and Crawford visited each other's family homes in Chattanooga and Akron. Following her break-up with Patten circa 1937, Crawford later became the lifelong partner of chef Ruth Norman. She died in 1986.

== Notable productions ==
- Awake and Sing! (The Group Theatre) (1935)
- Porgy and Bess (1942), co-produced with John Wildberg
- One Touch of Venus (1943), co-produced with John Wildberg
- Brigadoon (1947)
- The Rose Tattoo (1951)
- Paint Your Wagon (1951)
- Sweet Bird of Youth (1959)
- Jennie (1963)
- Celebration (1969)
- Yentl (1975)
