= The Durante-Moore Show =

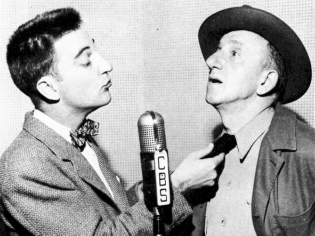
- The stars of the show, Garry Moore (left) and Jimmy Durante (right).
- Other names: The Camel Comedy Caravan
- Genre: Comedy
- Running time: 30 minutes
- Country of origin: United States
- Language: English
- Syndicates: NBC; CBS
- Starring: Jimmy Durante; Garry Moore
- Announcer: Jimmy Wallington
- Created by: Phil Cohan
- Written by: Syd Resnick; Jackie Barrett
- Directed by: Phil Cohan
- Produced by: Phil Cohan
- Original release: March 25, 1943 – June 27, 1947
- No. of series: 5
- Opening theme: You Gotta Start Off Each Day with a Song
- Ending theme: Inka Dinka Doo
- Sponsored by: Camel; Rexall

The Durante-Moore Show was an old-time radio show that ran on NBC with episodes running from March 25, 1943–October 28, 1943 and on CBS with episodes running from October 8, 1943–June 27, 1947.

The series starred burlesque and vaudeville veteran entertainer Jimmy Durante and radio personality Garry Moore.

The series was sponsored by Camel cigarettes and the Rexall Drug Corporation.

The show also coined the famous catchphrase "Dat's my boy dat said dat!" which was said by Durante, often speaking of something that Moore said. That catchphrase would later inspire the legendary cartoon Augie Doggie and Doggie Daddy.

== Background ==
The origins of The Durante-Moore Show can probably be traced back to several radio stints that Jimmy Durante had in the 1930s.

On September 10, 1933, Durante appeared on NBC radio's The Chase and Sanborn Hour which, at that time starred Eddie Cantor. He continued to make recurring appearances on the program until November 12 of that year. When Cantor left the show, Durante took over as the host from April 22 to September 30, 1934.

Durante then became a regular on NBC's Camel Caravan. It was in 1943 when Caravan producer Phil Cohan decided to pair Durante with a young Garry Moore. Moore was an announcer on the radio at the time. After that episode aired, Cohan decided to create a radio series for the two. The series was to be a summer replacement series for The Abbott and Costello Show. Lou Costello, however, suffered a heart attack which put The Abbott and Costello Show on a short hiatus and, looking for a quick replacement, NBC put Durante and Moore on the air.

On March 25, 1943, The Durante-Moore Show premiered on NBC under the name The Camel Comedy Caravan. The series was sponsored originally by Camel cigarettes. This sponsorship concluded after Camel refused to renew the series after the end of its third season. The March 30, 1945 broadcast was the last show sponsored by Camel. The show continued on April 6, 1945, with Rexall as its sponsor. The series had moved to CBS in October 1943.

== Moore's departure ==
In the spring of 1947, Moore departed from the show. The reason why Moore left was to pursue a career in comedy. Another reason to Moore's departure was because CBS Television offered Moore his own daytime variety show The Garry Moore Show which started in 1949.

== The Jimmy Durante Show ==
The Jimmy Durante Show
- Genre: Comedy
- Running time: 30 minutes
- Country of origin: United States
- Language: English
- Syndicates: NBC
- Starring: Jimmy Durante; Peggy Lee seasons 1-2; Florence Halop seasons 1-2; Alan Young season 3
- Announcer: Howard Petrie
- Written by: Syd Resnick; Jackie Barrett
- Directed by: Phil Cohan
- Produced by: Phil Cohan
- Original release: October 1, 1947 – June 30, 1950
- No. of series: 3
- Opening theme: You Gotta Start Off Each Day with a Song
- Ending theme: Inka Dinka Doo
- Sponsored by: Camel

The Jimmy Durante Show was an American old-time radio show. It aired on NBC with episodes running from October 1, 1947–June 30, 1950. It was a continuation of the NBC/CBS radio series The Durante-Moore Show after Garry Moore left when he was offered his own show on CBS Television.

In mid-1947, Moore decided to leave the series after he was offered his own show on CBS Television. The last episode Moore appeared in and the last episode of the series under the name The Durante-Moore Show aired on June 27, 1947. The series then went under a short hiatus and then, on October 1, 1947, the series went back on the air this time on NBC under a new name The Jimmy Durante Show.

The series originally starred Jimmy Durante with recurring guest stars Peggy Lee and Florence Halop. In its last season, actor and personality Alan Young was brought in as Durante's straight man.

Ratings for the show were good. At the end of the 1947–48 season, The Jimmy Durante Show was tied for the number 7 show on the air along with Philco Radio Time on ABC and Dr. Christian on CBS. The show managed to stay in the top ten throughout its entire run. The series ended in June 1950 after Durante made a move to television with a starring role on NBC's Four Star Revue.

== Broadcast history ==
NOTE: The most frequent time slot for the series in bold text.

=== The Durante-Moore Show ===
- Thursday at 10:00-10:30 pm on NBC: March 28, 1943–October 28, 1943
- **Friday at 10:00-10:30 pm on CBS: October 8, 1943–June 1946**
- Friday at 9:30-10:00 pm on CBS: September 1946–June 27, 1947

=== The Jimmy Durante Show ===
- Wednesday at 10:30-11:00 pm on NBC: October 1, 1947–June 23, 1948
- Friday at 8:30-9:00 pm on NBC: October 8, 1948–1949
- **Friday at 9:30-10:00 pm on NBC: September 1949–June 30, 1950**
