= A Rhapsody in Black and Blue =

1932 film by Aubrey Scotto

- Directed by: Aubrey Scotto
- Screenplay by: Phil Cohan
- Starring: Louis Armstrong; Sidney Easton; Fanny Belle DeKnight
- Music by: Louis Armstrong
- Production company: Paramount Pictures
- Distributed by: Paramount Pictures
- Release date: 1932
- Running time: 10 minutes
- Country: United States
- Language: English

A Rhapsody in Black and Blue is a 1932 American short black and white film directed by Aubrey Scotto and starring Louis Armstrong, Sidney Easton and Fanny Belle DeKnight. It was written by Phil Cohan. The film includes the tunes "I’ll Be Glad When You Are Dead You Rascal You" and "Shine", sung and played by Armstrong.

== Plot ==
A husband who would rather listen to jazz and drum on pots and pans than mop the floor is whacked over the head with the mop by his wife when she hears him listening to "I’ll Be Glad When You Are Dead You Rascal You". He falls into a dream in which he is the king of "Jazzmania," sitting on a royal throne with servants to fan him. In the dream Louis Armstrong plays and sings jazz for him while dressed in a leopard print cave man outfit. When he wakes up and sees his flustered wife still standing over him, he smiles and breaks a vase over his own head.

== Cast ==
- Louis Armstrong and his orchestra
- Sidney Easton
- Fanny Belle DeKnight.

== Critical response ==
In 2022 The New York Times wrote: "Armstrong ... contended with degrading scenes. In A Rhapsody in Black and Blue (1932), Armstrong performed two numbers "dressed as an African savage in a sparsely cut leopard skin," Thomas Brothers writes in Louis Armstrong, Master of Modernism."
