= The Guy Mitchell Show =

American musical TV series (1957–1958)

- Written by: William Derman; Ben Starr
- Directed by: Kevin Jonson
- Presented by: Guy Mitchell
- Music by: Van Alexander
- Opening theme: "Singing the Blues"
- Country of origin: United States

Production
- Producer: Phil Cohan

Original release
- Network: ABC
- Release: October 7, 1957 – January 13, 1958

The Guy Mitchell Show is an American musical television series that was broadcast on ABC from October 7, 1957, until January 13, 1958.

== Format ==
Singer Guy Mitchell was the program's host, with Dolores Hawkins, the Guy Mitchell Singers, and the Ted Cappy Dancers as regular performers. The Van Alexander Orchestra provided music. Guests on the show included Chuck Berry, Margaret Whiting, Jack Carson, Peggy Lee, Marguerite Piazza, and Dizzy Dean.

The show's format was revised in November 1957 to increase the focus on music. Eddie Joy, who was the program's executive producer, said, "We made the same mistake everybody did, with a smattering of comedy, music — everything. From now on music will be the most important part of the show." That change included paying performers who had been scheduled to appear in upcoming episodes but found their contracts canceled.

== Production ==
Phil Cohan was the producer of The Guy Mitchell Show, with Kevin Jonson as the director. The writers were William Derman and Ben Starr. The show was produced in Hollywood after initial plans called for it to originate from New York. That move required changes in guests and writers. The show was broadcast on Mondays from 8 to 8:30 p.m. Eastern Time, when its competition included The Restless Gun on NBC and The George Burns and Gracie Allen Show on CBS. ABC's Videotape Center in Chicago recorded episodes for delayed broadcasts in some markets. Max Factor cosmetics sponsored the program, Its theme was Singing the Blues. It was replaced by Love That Jill.

== Critical response ==
A review in the trade publication Variety said that the show's premiere episode "covered a lot of ground in its half-hour — too much so for viewer comfort." The review commended Mitchell's efforts in "soloing, duetting and bantering with his two guests" but said, "since Mitchell is not yet a star of first magnitude, it was too much to expect him to overcome the excesses" of adding attempts at comedy to his musical performances.

A follow-up review in Variety called The Guy Mitchell Show "a pleasing, if not standout, musical half-hour." The review complimented the singing of Mitchell and Hawkins and said that Mitchell "handles the emcee chores with a boyish enthusiasm."
