= Carry Nation (play) =

Play by Frank McGrath

Carry Nation is an historical play by Frank McGrath about the temperance leader Carrie Nation. It ran on Broadway and starred American film actress Esther Dale in the title role.

== Broadway run ==
Carry Nation premiered in New York on Broadway at the Biltmore Theatre on October 29, 1932, and starred Esther Dale, who had been known principally as a singer up to that time. The show was produced by Dale’s husband, the writer and theater producer Arthur J. Beckhard, and was directed by stage actress Blanche Yurka. The show was playwright McGrath’s only Broadway play and closed after just 30 performances.

Despite its being a flop, the show was notable for having launched the Broadway careers of supporting actress Mildred Natwick and the actors Jimmy Stewart, Myron McCormick and Josh Logan, who had known one another at Princeton University where the three men were members of the University Players theater company. At the time, they were rooming in New York with a fourth University Player alumnus, Henry Fonda. Logan also served as assistant director to Blanche Yurka in the production. The show had originated in summer stock, and some of the young players from the earlier staging were carried over into the New York production in small roles.

Esther Dale received glowing reviews from the New York critics for her portrayal of Carry (sic). In addition to Dale, the featured performers included Leslie Adams, Donald Foster, Daisy Belmore, Byron McGrath, John Parrish, Ernest Pollock and Fannie Bell De Knight.

== Principal roles ==
(in order of speech)

- Aunt Judy – Fannie Belle De Knight
- George Moore – John Parrish
- James Campbell – Myron McCormick
- Mary Campbell Moore – Gertrude Garstin
- Charles Gloyd – Byron McGrath
- Sam – Buddy De Loach
- Mrs. Gloyd – Frieda Altman
- Dr. Hull – Ernest Pollock
- Miss Sicat – Minna Adams
- David Nation – Leslie Adams
- Carry Nation – Esther Dale
- Mrs. Noble – Mildred Natwick
- Daniel Dent – Donald Foster
- Mrs. Cain – Daisy Belmore
- A Brute – Clarence E. Smith
- Mart Strong – Joshua Logan
- Constable Gano – James Stewart
- Mayor Washbrook – Arthur C. Morris
- O.L. Day – Charles E. Arnt
- A Salesperson – Kenneth Berry
- Kiowan Youths – Frank Thomas, Jr., Rufus Peabody, Drew Price
- Sporting Girls – Barbara O'Neil, Lillian Okun
- Senator – John F. Morrissey
- The Mayor of Kiowa – Alfred Dalrymple
- Mrs. Skoll – Nina Varesi
- Skoll – Luther Williams
- Jailor – Walter Eviston
- Landlord – Harry Bellaver
- Leader of the Vigilantes – Karl Swenson
- The Woman With a Whip – Roberta Hoskins
- The Woman With a Club – Bela Axman
- Louis Sauerberger – Frederick Kemp
- A Whiskey Drinker – Leslie Hunt
- Mrs. Klopp – Katherine Emery
- Miss Sheriff – Helen Huberth
- Mrs. McHenty – Mary Jeffery
- Chairman – Robert Allen

== Synopsis of scenes ==
The story line of the play followed the chronology of the prohibitionist leader's life, beginning with her birth in 1846 in Kentucky to a zealously pious father, her marriage to a chronic drunk, a second marriage to a country preacher, her public campaign against Demon Rum and her infamous marches culminating in the axing of booze barrels. The story concluded with her final appearance before a Town Hall gathering in Tennessee in 1910.

- Scene 1: A farmhouse in Kentucky. November 25, 1846.
- Scene 2: In front of the Moore home in Missouri. April, 1857.
- Scene 3: A room in the home of Dr. Gloyd in Holden. Missouri, June, 1868.
- Scene 4: Same as preceding scene. December, 1877.
- Scene 5: Interior of the Christian Church in Medicine Lodge. Kansas, July, 1899.
- Scene 6: A room in the Nation home in Medicine Lodge. A few weeks later.
- Scene 7: The front room of Mart Strong’s saloon in Medicine Lodge. February, 1900.
- Scene 8: O.L. Day’s drug store in Medicine Lodge. February, 1900.
- Scene 9: A street in Kiowa, Kansas. August, 1900.
- Scene 10: The jail in Kiowa. Immediately after preceding scene.
- Scene 11: The jail. Three weeks later.
- Scene 12: A room in Stag’s Hotel, Enterprise, Kansas. That night.
- Scene 13: Louis Sauerberger’s saloon, Topeka, Kansas. The next day.
- Scene 14: A room in the home of Mrs. Klopp in Kansas City, Missouri. June, 1903.
- Scene 15: The Town Hall, Waterville, Tennessee. May, 1910.
