= The Bridge of San Luis Rey (1944 film) =

1944 Benedict Bogeaus film

- Theatrical release poster
- Directed by: Rowland V. Lee
- Written by: Howard Estabrook; Herman Weissman; Thornton Wilder (novel)
- Produced by: Rowland V. Lee; Benedict Bogeaus
- Starring: Lynn Bari; Akim Tamiroff; Francis Lederer; Nazimova; Louis Calhern; Blanche Yurka; Donald Woods
- Cinematography: John W. Boyle; John J. Mescall (uncredited)
- Edited by: Harvey Manger
- Music by: Dimitri Tiomkin
- Production company: Benedict Bogeaus Productions
- Distributed by: United Artists
- Release date: February 11, 1944 (United States)
- Running time: 107 minutes
- Country: United States
- Language: English
- Box office: $900,000

The Bridge of San Luis Rey is a 1944 drama film made by Benedict Bogeaus Productions and released by United Artists. It was produced and directed by Rowland V. Lee with Benedict Bogeaus as co-producer. The screenplay by Howard Estabrook and Herman Weissman was adapted from the 1927 novel The Bridge of San Luis Rey by Thornton Wilder. The music score was by Dimitri Tiomkin and the cinematography by John W. Boyle and an uncredited John J. Mescall. The film stars Lynn Bari, Francis Lederer, Akim Tamiroff, Nazimova and Louis Calhern.

Dimitri Tiomkin's music was nominated for the Best Original Score.

== Plot ==
In the year of 1774, a hundred-year-old bridge leading to the chapel of San Luis Rey in Peru, plunges into the deep chasm it spans, killing the five people who are crossing it. Brother Juniper (Donald Woods) is one of the chapel monks, whose faith is rocked by the unfortunate incident. He travels to Lima to seek answers to his questions why these five were chosen by God to die this violent death.

In Lima, Brother Juniper talks to a well known local theatre figure called Uncle Pio (Akim Tamiroff), and asks him about a famous actress, Micaela Villegas (Lynn Bari). Pio then starts telling the story of his encounter with Micaela and the unfortunate events leading up to the tragic accident.

Years ago, when Micaela was working in Lima, she was in love with the bold, exciting Manuel (Francis Lederer). His twin brother, Esteban, loathed Micaela. When Manuel left for Spain, Pio became Micaela's mentor and helped her become an excellent actress, working for the Comedia Theater.

Her celebrity and beauty attracted the viceroy Don Andre's (Louis Calhern) interest, and he asked her to pay him a private visit at his mansion. Just before Micaela is about to go to the viceroy, Manuel returns from his journey and instead of going to the viceroy, she spends the night with her beloved Manuel.

Tension rises between the twin brothers when Manuel discovers all the letters Micaela has written to him, that Esteban neglected to forward to him. Esteban apologizes and feels guilt over what he has done, to the point that he is about to take his own life, but Manuel stops him from hanging himself.

When Estaban has recovered, Manuel embarks on a new long journey. When Micaela once again is invited to the viceroy, she accepts the invitation. Because of the viceroy's interest in Micaela, the Marquesa Dona Maria (Nazimova) feels threatened and decides to get rid of her. The Marquesa pretends to be Micaela's friend to win her confidence, unlike the other prominent guests of the viceroy. This is the end of Uncle Pio's telling of the story.

Juniper goes on to visit the Abbess (Blanche Yurka). She tells him about the Marquesa, whose daughter eloped to Spain and married a young aristocrat. The Marquesa confided her loneliness to the Abbess, and was recommended a young companion, an orphan named Pepita, whom the Marquesa ended up treating badly because of her own bitterness. Pio was also consulted by the Marquesa, about the viceroy and Micaela, but Pio doesn't have any information to give.

The viceroy falls in love with Micaela, and Esteban warns her that the noblemen are scheming to get rid of her. Micaela is upset and turns to Pio for help, and he gives her a song to use during her performance at the castle. The lyrics tell of a scheme take over the throne, and the aristocrat audience is very offended. The viceroy forces Micaela to apologize, but the Marquesa realizes how stupid she has been and in turn apologizes to Micaela. She starts pondering over the human nature and of peoples ability to transform into something better, like Esteban and the Marquesa.

Manuel returns from his travels as a captain, and asks Micaela to come with him. The viceroy enters when they embrace, and demands to see Manuel at his palace. Manuel is arrested that night, since the viceroy sees him as too much competition for Micaela.

When the viceroy is asked to return to Spain again, he asks Micaela to accompany him. She refuses because of Manuel's incarceration. She begs Pio for help to free Manuel from prison, before going on a trip to the mountains with the viceroy and his following.

Pio manages to set Manuel free, but he is interrogated by the viceroy afterwards. Pio advises the viceroy not to kill Manuel, since it will make him a martyr. Following this advice, Manuel is pardoned, and Pio brings the signed document to where Manuel is hiding, by the bridge to San Luis Rey.

Soon after, the viceroy and his small following, including Micaela, the Marquesa, Pepita and their scribe Esteban, arrive at the bridge. The viceroy crosses the bridge to the other side, and is followed by the others. Just as Micaela is about to start crossing, Manuel turns up, stops and kisses her. She manages to take only one step on the bridge when it collapses, sending the viceroy, the Marquesa, Esteban, Pepita and another man to their deaths. Micaela is pulled away and saved by Manuel.

== Cast ==
- Lynn Bari as Micaela Villegas
- Akim Tamiroff as Uncle Pio
- Francis Lederer as Esteban / Manuel
- Nazimova as Doña Maria
- Louis Calhern as Don Andre
- Donald Woods as Brother Juniper
- Blanche Yurka as The Abbess
- Emma Dunn as Doña Mercedes
- Barton Hepburn as Don Rubio
- Joan Lorring as Pepita

== Background and production ==
The film and novel are very loosely based on the real-life story of Micaela Villegas (1748–1819), a famous Peruvian entertainer known as La Perichole, whose life was also the inspiration for the novella Le Carrosse du Saint-Sacrement by Prosper Mérimée; an opéra bouffe, La Périchole by Jacques Offenbach; and Jean Renoir’s 1953 film Le Carrosse d'or (The Golden Coach).

There was also an earlier part-talkie film version of The Bridge of San Luis Rey (1929) starring Lili Damita. The film was remade once more in 2004 with the title The Bridge of San Luis Rey and starring F. Murray Abraham, Kathy Bates and Pilar López de Ayala.

== See also ==
- List of American films of 1944
