= Phil Cohan =

American producer and director (1905–1999)

- Born: Phillip W. Cohan; April 17, 1905; Meriden, Connecticut, U.S.
- Died: November 27, 1999; Pacific Palisades, California, U.S.
- Occupations: Director, producer
- Spouse: Mary Helen Foster

Phillip W. Cohan (April 17, 1905–November 27, 1999) was an American producer and director.

Cohan started out as an employee for Paramount Pictures. From there he went to radio and then to television. He was most famous for his involvement in the short film A Rhapsody in Black and Blue and as the creator, producer and director of The Durante-Moore Show starring Jimmy Durante and Garry Moore. He also was the producer of The Guy Mitchell Show.

== Personal life ==
Phillip Cohan was born in 1905 in Meriden, Connecticut, and is one of six children from Herman and Margaret Cohen. He graduated from the University of Pennsylvania.

He was married to Mary Helen Foster and had two children: Tony and Muffy. He died on November 27, 1999, in Westlake, Ohio, at the age of 94. Cohan is buried in Los Angeles, CA.
