= Blanche Yurka =

American actress and director (1887–1974)

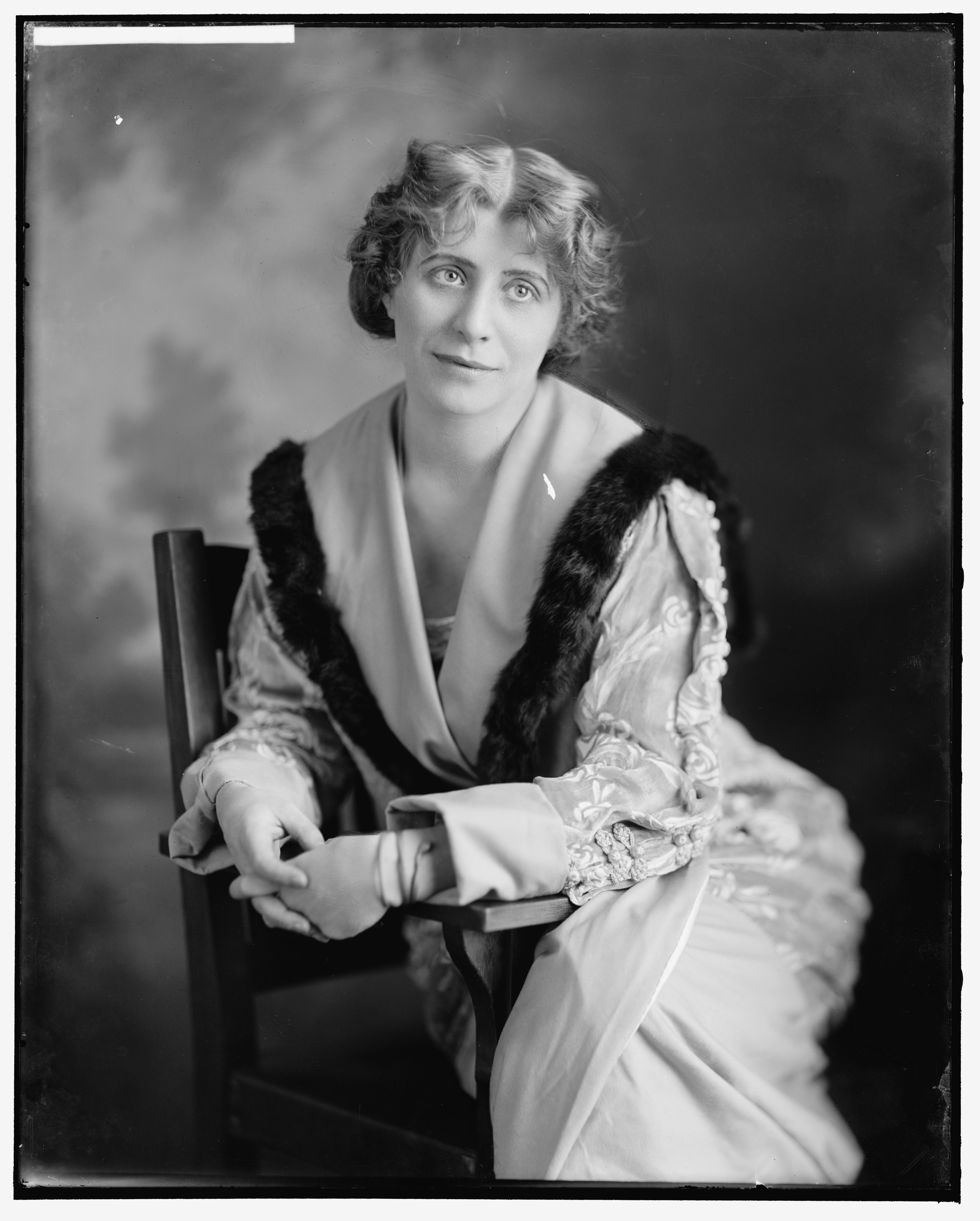
- Yurka in the 1940s
- Born: Blanch Jurka; June 19, 1887; St. Paul, Minnesota, U.S.
- Died: June 6, 1974 (aged 86); New York City, U.S.
- Resting place: Kensico Cemetery, Valhalla, New York City
- Occupations: Actress; director
- Years active: 1910–1967
- Known for: A Tale of Two Cities; Electra; Troilus and Cressida; The Song of Bernadette; The Bridge of San Luis Rey
- Spouse: Ian Keith (m. 1922; div. 1926)

Blanche Yurka (born Blanch Jurka; June 19, 1887 – June 6, 1974) was an American stage and film actress and director. She was an opera singer with minor roles at the Metropolitan Opera and later became a stage actress, making her Broadway debut in 1906 and established herself as a character actor of the classical stage, also appearing in several films of the 1930s and 1940s.

In addition to her many stage roles, which included Queen Gertrude opposite John Barrymore's Hamlet, she was an occasional director and playwright. She remained active in theater and film until the late 1960s. Her most famous film role was Madame Defarge in MGM's version of A Tale of Two Cities (1935), but she was also the compassionate aunt in The Song of Bernadette (1943). Another memorable role was as Zachary Scott's widowed mother in The Southerner (1945).

== Early life ==
Yurka was born Blanch Jurka, purportedly in St. Paul, Minnesota, the third child of Catholic Czech immigrants Karolína Anna Uher-Jurka (née Nováková), from Rychnov nad Kněžnou, and her second husband, Prof. Antonín Jurka, from Kralovice. Antonín was a teacher of Czech and German and a librarian who previously worked as an editor and led a Free Church. Jurka inherited her father's artistic and scholarly interests, including a love of music and acting. She finished grade school before her father lost his job teaching Czech at the Jefferson School in St. Paul. He found a new position with the Czech Benevolent Society in New York and moved the family to the Upper East Side of Manhattan in 1900.

Her parents used their modest income to provide Blanche with singing lessons in New York even before she entered high school (1901–03). Her vocal talent attracted the admiration of composer and singer Harry Burleigh, and she won a scholarship at age 15 to study voice and ballet at the Metropolitan Opera School (1903–05). She appeared in an amateur Czech-language production of Michael William Balfe's The Bohemian Girl and made her Metropolitan Opera stage debut in the Christmas 1903 production of Wagner's Parsifal - the first staged performance of the opera outside of Bayreuth - appearing as a flower girl and as the Grail-bearer. In his review of the premiere performance, New York Tribune music critic Henry Krehbiel singled out her contribution: "And while pointing out the beauty of the work of the principals, it is a pleasant privilege to lay a wreath at the feet of the little lady who carried the Grail with such reverent and touching consecration to her sacred duties."

She continued her studies at the Met Opera School but was dismissed when she injured her voice singing the role of Leonora in Verdi's Il Trovatore in an amateur production. She transferred to the Institute for Musical Art (1905–07), forerunner of the Juilliard School but was dismissed from there for the same reason. Having lost her chance at an operatic career, she took the Institute director's suggestion and tried for a career on the theater stage. Through persistence, she managed to get an audition with the theater impresario David Belasco. According to her autobiography, he said to her: "Your diction is clear and pure. Your voice has good timbre. I can sense that you have temperament. We must find out if you can act." He gave her a bit part in The Rose of the Rancho (1906), and the following year, he extended her a contract, at which time she changed her surname to "Yurka", a homophone of her true surname.

== Stage career ==
Beginning with The Warrens of Virginia (1907), Blanche spent the next decade alternating between stock and touring productions. In 1909, she had a small part in Leo Ditrichstein's Is Matrimony a Failure? at the Belasco Theater. There, she met actress Jane Cowl, who was starring in the production as Fanny Perry. Yurka had minor roles in several plays, including An Old New Yorker (1911), The House of Bondage (1914) Our American Cousin (1915) and a pair of plays by Jane Cowl, Daybreak (1917) and Information Please (1918).

In 1922-23, she was Queen Gertrude to John Barrymore's Hamlet in Arthur Hopkins' production of Hamlet at the Sam Harris Theater and Manhattan Opera House, where it ran for a combined 125 performances. At 42, Barrymore was a little old to be playing her son (she was 35), and she made herself appear as youthful as possible to vent her irritation.

Prior to Hamlet, she appeared in The Law Breaker, where she met a charming young character actor named Ian Keith (née Keith Ross), who was 12 years her junior. They married in September 1922, her only marriage and his second. Her growing stature as an actress - combined with his jealousy - eventually came between them; they separated in 1925 and divorced in 1926. Yurka never remarried and had no children.

Building on her repertoire of classic characters, Yurka starred in a quartet of Ibsen plays, directing three of them: The Wild Duck (1928, as Gina Ekdal), Hedda Gabler (1929, title role) and The Vikings (1930, as Hjordis); she also had the title role of Ellida in The Lady from the Sea (1929).

In the year 1932 alone, she played the title role in Sophocles' Electra, was Helen of Troy in Shakespeare's Troilus and Cressida, directed Carry Nation starring Esther Dale (a production that featured the Broadway debuts of Mildred Natwick and James Stewart) and appeared in Katharine Cornell's production of Lucrece by Deems Taylor and Thornton Wilder. She won critical acclaim in 1935 when she replaced Edith Evans as the Nurse in Romeo and Juliet opposite Cornell's Juliet.

She co-adapted to stage the Spanish comedy, Spring in Autumn (1933) by Gregorio Martínez Sierra and María Martínez Sierra, which reunited her with Carry Nation co-stars Esther Dale, Mildred Natwick, and James Stewart, and featured Yurka singing a Puccini aria while standing on her head.

== Film career ==
Yurka was foremost a stage actress and for a long time considered film-making an inferior art form. Her low opinion of the movies started to change when she saw John Ford's The Informer, adapted from the novel by Liam O'Flaherty. When she finally made her belated screen debut at the age of 47, it was in the role that many consider the greatest of her film career, the poisonously vindictive revolutionary Thérèse Defarge in A Tale of Two Cities. Producer David O. Selznick's first choice for the part of Madame Defarge was the Russian-born stage actress Alla Nazimova, who turned it down but recommended Yurka, declaring her the "only" actress for the part. The two women hadn't yet met but were well acquainted with one another's work inasmuch as they were the leading Ibsen heroines on the Broadway stage. Despite Nazimova's endorsement, Yurka was the 67th actor tested for the role.

Yurka threw herself into the part – quite literally. Her final fight scene with Edna May Oliver (who was only four years older than Yurka) showed the two actresses tumbling over tables and over the floor, offering a hint of Yurka's onstage physicality. Although not nominated for a best supporting actress Academy Award (the supporting categories weren't established until the following year), her character portrayal was a model of a sinister screen villain. In close-up, she flashed a look of steely malevolence; in her speech to the revolutionary tribunal – asking for the conviction and execution of Charles Darnay – she played it large and to the rafters. The film was only nominated in the Best Film and Best Editing categories, not even its star, Ronald Colman getting an Oscar nod.

She sought to play O-Lan in the 1937 film The Good Earth but lost out to Luise Rainer, who won an Academy Award for her performance. She also lost the role of Pilar in For Whom the Bell Tolls to Greek actress Katina Paxinou, who went on to win an Oscar for best supporting actress.

Her follow-up to A Tale of Two Cities was the lead in a B movie shoot-'em-up, Queen of the Mob (1940), in which Yurka played a gangster matriarch closely based on the contemporary outlaw, Ma Barker. Her severe, vaguely imperious looks led to her casting in a rogue's gallery of austere or villainous parts. Through the 1940s and with decreasing frequency in the 1950s, she appeared in a succession of B parts that wasted her talents, occasionally landing supporting character parts in A list movies. Among the latter were The Song of Bernadette (1943) – again for David O. Selznick – in which she played Jennifer Jones' aunt and The Bridge of San Luis Rey (1944), as the Abbess of San Luis Rey chapel. Notably, one of her co-stars in the latter film was Alla Nazimova (who had suggested Yurka's casting as Madame Defarge) playing the Marquessa Doña Maria. In The Southerner (1945), an American frontier drama directed by Jean Renoir, Yurka's Mama Tucker was the widowed daughter-in-law of cantankerous Granny Tucker played by Beulah Bondi.

== Radio career ==
Yurka had the role of Mrs. Hunter in the soap opera Valiant Lady.

== Post-War years ==
Yurka never left the theater, but as her Hollywood roles became less satisfying after the war, the pace of both her film and stage roles fell off. During World War II, she contributed her time and talent to the war effort as a theater performer. She toured with theater troupes in Europe both before and after the war. In December, 1945, she appeared at the Majestic Theatre for two readings of Sophocles' Oedipus Rex with classics scholar Eugene O'Neill, Jr.

Yurka was active in theater causes all her life. She supported the 1919 actors' strike. She later vigorously defended the interests of American actors against a British invasion of American theaters. She aligned herself with Tallulah Bankhead's defense of the Federal Theater Project at the 1939 Senate Appropriations Committee hearings that de-funded the program in reaction to productions that were deemed sympathetic to the political left-wing.

On occasion, she could be critical of Broadway for production values which did not live up to the highest standards. In a letter to the New York Times, published November 6, 1955, she reproached the theater community's "passion for ugliness that seems so much a part of our theater today." Before the year was over, she announced her retirement from the stage – a short-lived retirement that would find her back onstage exactly a year later in the Phoenix Theatre's Diary of a Scoundrel. In 1957, she visited Athens under the aegis of the United States International Exchange of Artists to open the Greek Drama Festival. There, she appeared in a reading of Aeschylus' Prometheus Bound in the translation by Edith Hamilton. In 1958, she appeared at the Belasco Theater in Huntington Hartford's Jane Eyre.

In the last 15 years of her life, few stage or film roles came her way. She appeared sporadically in television shows in the '50s, notably, Lux Video Theater, The Philip Morris Playhouse and Ponds Theater. She was shocked at being offered the brief role of Mrs. Wendell the cook in the cancelled MGM remake of Dinner at Eight (1969) – the role played by May Robson in the 1933 film. She concluded her career on a note of personal triumph with her critically acclaimed London performance as The Madwoman of Chaillot (1969). When the play traveled to off-Broadway in 1970, the New York critics' reception was lukewarm, and Yurka retired from acting soon after the show closed.

== Death ==
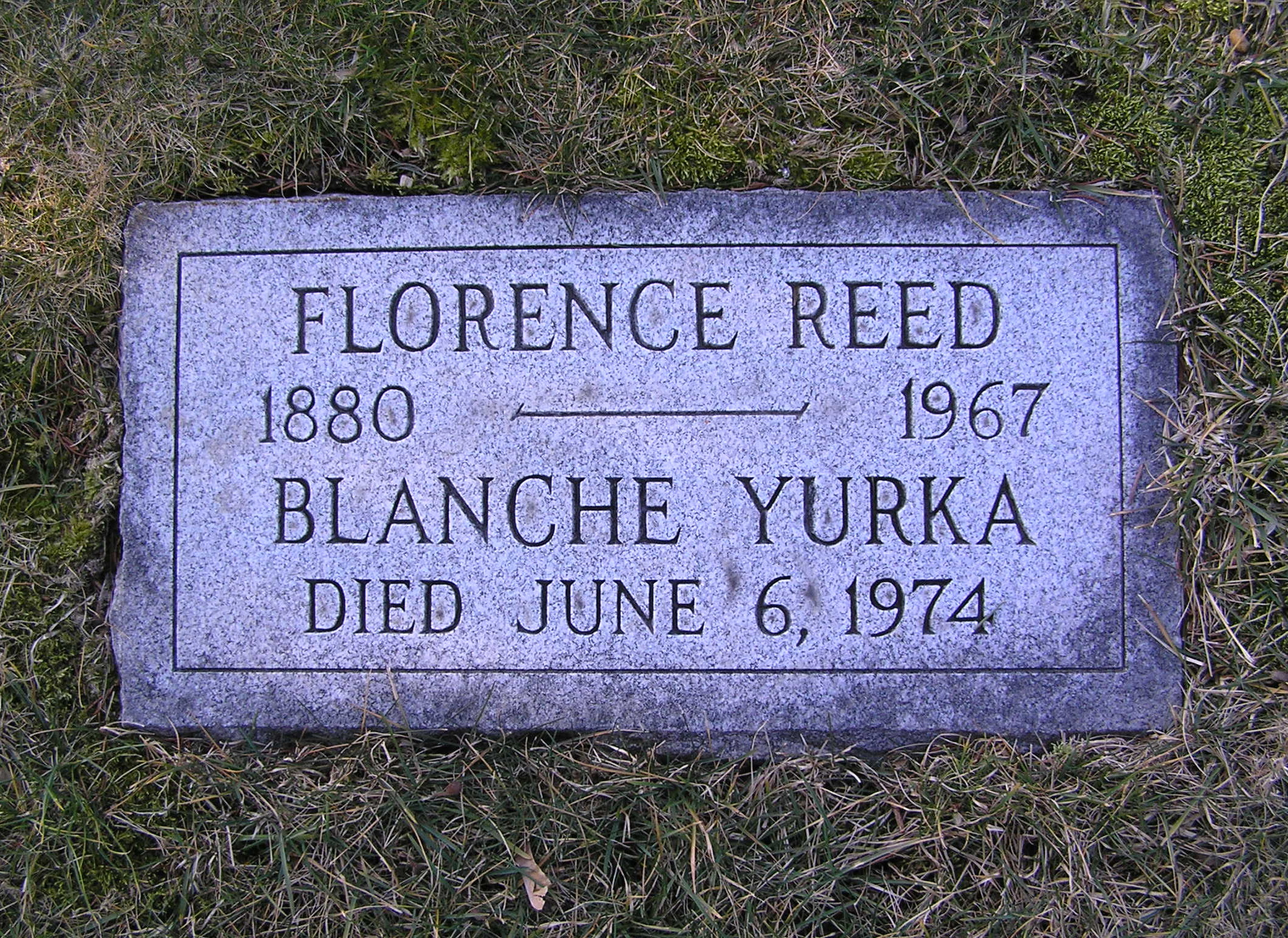
Grave of Blanche Yurka

Yurka collected her thoughts about acting technique in the book Dear Audience (1959) and wrote a memoir, Bohemian Girl (1970). She was a popular guest at women's clubs and colleges, where she continued to perform dramatic readings. She suffered from failing health in her final years owing to arteriosclerosis and died June 6, 1974, at age 86. She was interred in the same burial plot with her good friend, actress Florence Reed, in the Actors Fund of America section of Kensico Cemetery, Valhalla, New York.

== Selected filmography ==
- A Tale of Two Cities (1935) as Madame Thérèse Defarge
- Queen of the Mob (1940) as Ma Webster
- Escape (1940) as Nurse
- City for Conquest (1940) as Mrs. Nash
- Ellery Queen and the Murder Ring (1941) as Mrs. Augusta Stack
- Pacific Rendezvous (1942) as Mrs. Savarina
- Lady for a Night (1942) as Julia Alderson
- Keeper of the Flame (1942) as Mrs. Anna Taylor
- A Night to Remember (1942) as Mrs. Salter
- The Song of Bernadette (1943) as Aunt Bernarde Casterot
- Tonight We Raid Calais (1943) as Widow Grelieu
- Cry of the Werewolf (1944) as Bianca
- One Body Too Many (1944) as Matthews
- The Bridge of San Luis Rey (1944) as The Abbess
- The Southerner (1945) as Mama Tucker
- The Flame (1947) as Aunt Margaret
- 13 Rue Madeleine (1947) as Madame Thillot
- The Furies (1950) as Herrera's Mother
- At Sword's Point (1952) as Madame Michom
- Taxi (1953) as Mrs. Nielson
- Thunder in the Sun (1959) as Louise Dauphin
