= Medicine Lodge, Kansas =

City in Kiowa County, Kansas

- City and County seat
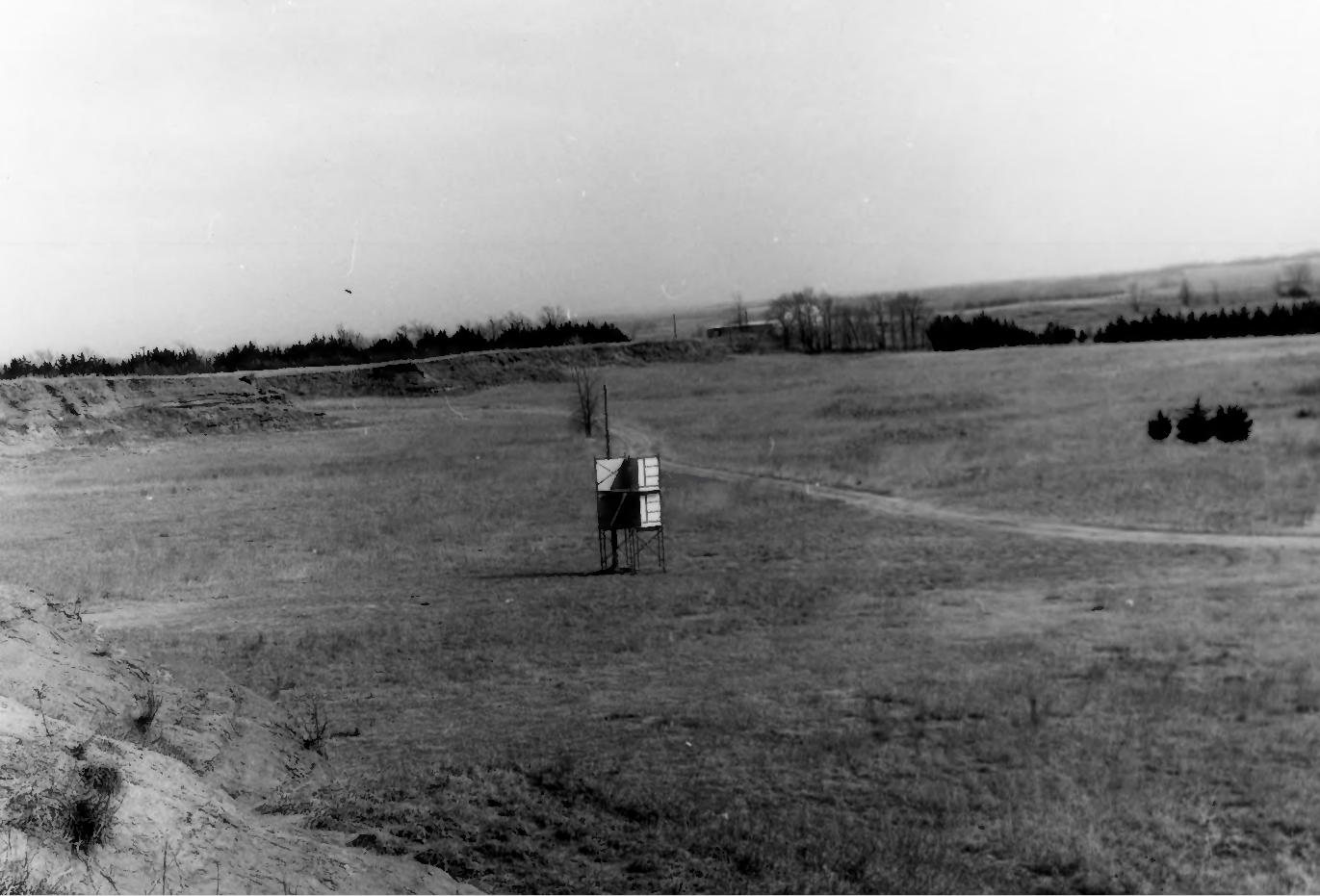
- Natural amphitheater at the Medicine Lodge Peace Treaty Site (1969)

- Location within Barber County and Kansas

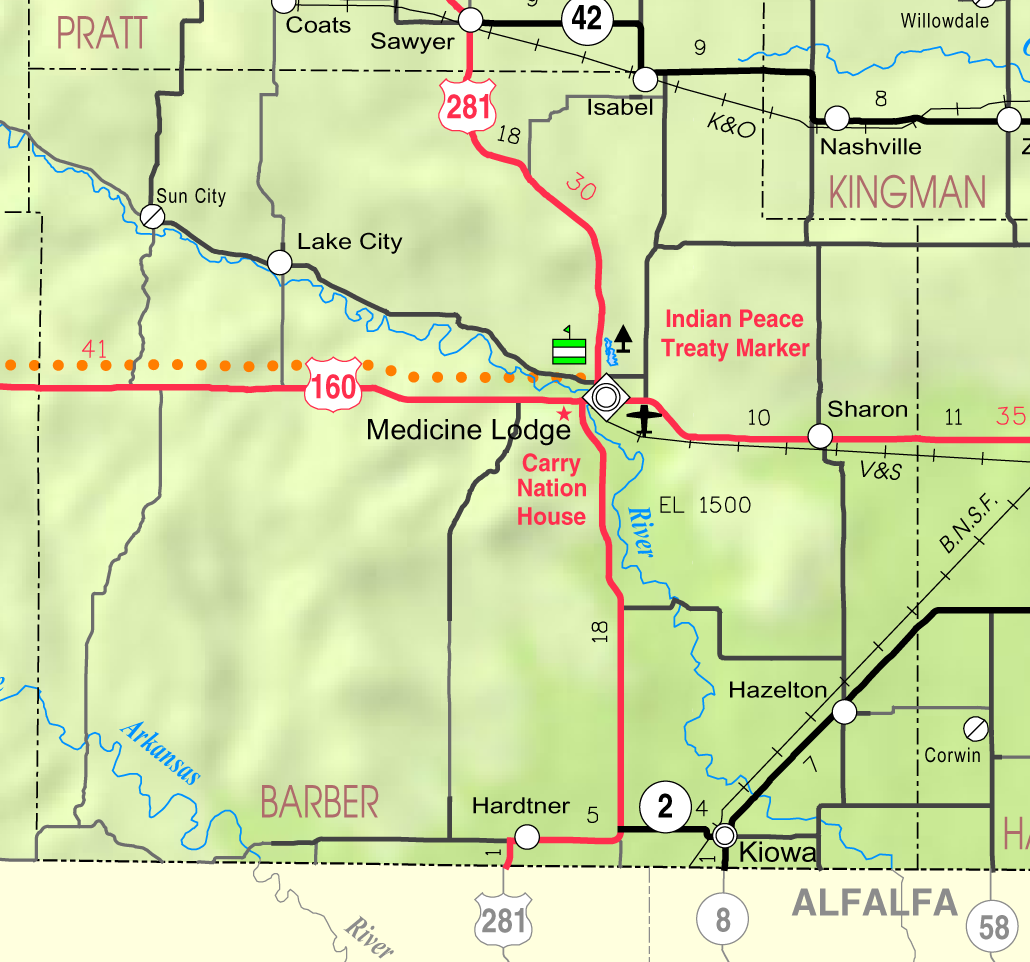
- KDOT map of Barber County (legend)
- Coordinates: 37°17′07″N 98°34′52″W
- Country: United States
- State: Kansas
- County: Barber
- Township: Medicine Lodge
- Founded: 1873
- Incorporated: 1879
- Named for: medicine lodge

Area
  - Total: 1.20 sq mi (3.10 km^{2})
  - Land: 1.20 sq mi (3.10 km^{2})
  - Water: 0 sq mi (0.00 km^{2})
- Elevation: 1,483 ft (452 m)

Population (2020)
  - Total: 1,781
  - Density: 1,490/sq mi (575/km^{2})
- Time zone: UTC-6 (CST)
  - Summer (DST): UTC-5 (CDT)
- ZIP Code: 67104
- Area code: 620
- FIPS code: 20-45500
- GNIS ID: 2395083
- Website: City website

Medicine Lodge is a city in and the county seat of Barber County, Kansas, United States. As of the 2020 census, the population of the city was 1,781.

== History ==
=== 19th century ===
The particular medicine lodge, mystery house or sacred tabernacle from which the Medicine Lodge River received its name was in reality an arbor-like shelter of tree trunks and leafy branches which was erected by the Kiowa people for the celebration of their annual sun dance in the summer of 1866. It was in the valley of the Medicine Lodge River, several miles below the present town of Medicine Lodge, which is at the mouth of Elm Creek. In their own language, the Kiowa people called this stream A-ya-dalda P'a, meaning "Timber-hill River." The Kiowa had considered the site sacred due to the high content of Epsom salts in the river.

In October 1867, the Medicine Lodge Treaty was a set of three treaties signed between the United States of America and the Kiowa, Comanche, Plains Apache, Southern Cheyenne, and Southern Arapaho. The site of the Peace Council camp was about three miles above that of the future town and on the same side of the river. A Peace Treaty Pageant, first presented in 1927 in an outdoor amphitheater on a quarter section of Kansas prairie, commemorates this significant event in Western history.

Settlers led by a man named John Hutchinson founded the town of Medicine Lodge north of the confluence of Elm Creek and the Medicine Lodge River in February 1873. The community grew rapidly with a hotel, stores, and a post office established within a year.

In 1874, in response to Indian raids in the region, residents and the state militia constructed a stockade. A group of Osage killed three settlers within a few miles of the compound, but no direct attack on the fortifications occurred. Medicine Lodge was incorporated as a city in 1879.

Temperance activist Carrie Nation launched her crusade against the sale of alcohol while living in Medicine Lodge in 1900. Her home and a reproduction of the 1873 stockade are open to the public.

== Geography ==
Medicine Lodge is located in south-central Kansas in the Red Hills region of the Great Plains. The city sits immediately north of the confluence of the Medicine Lodge River and Elm Creek. The city is on the northeast side of the river. Elm Creek flows south around the eastern and southern sides of the city. A tributary of Elm Creek, which flows south through Medicine Lodge, has been dammed immediately north of the city to form a reservoir, Barber County State Lake.

The city is located at the junction of U.S. Routes 160 and 281.

According to the United States Census Bureau, the city has a total area of 1.21 square miles (3.13 km^{2}), all land.

=== Climate ===
Medicine Lodge has a humid subtropical climate (Köppen Cfa) with hot, humid summers and cold, dry winters. The hottest temperature recorded in Medicine Lodge was 118 °F (47.8 °C) on August 12, 1936, while the coldest temperature recorded was −22 °F (−30.0 °C) on February 13, 1905.

Climate data for Medicine Lodge, Kansas, 1991–2020 normals, extremes 1895–present
Month	Jan	Feb	Mar	Apr	May	Jun	Jul	Aug	Sep	Oct	Nov	Dec	Year
Record high °F (°C)	82 (28)	91 (33)	98 (37)	102 (39)	106 (41)	113 (45)	115 (46)	118 (48)	112 (44)	100 (38)	90 (32)	85 (29)	118 (48)
Mean maximum °F (°C)	69.1 (20.6)	74.3 (23.5)	83.0 (28.3)	89.8 (32.1)	94.7 (34.8)	100.3 (37.9)	104.9 (40.5)	103.5 (39.7)	98.1 (36.7)	90.0 (32.2)	79.2 (26.2)	67.7 (19.8)	106.3 (41.3)
Mean daily maximum °F (°C)	46.2 (7.9)	50.4 (10.2)	60.2 (15.7)	70.0 (21.1)	79.3 (26.3)	90.1 (32.3)	94.4 (34.7)	92.4 (33.6)	84.4 (29.1)	71.8 (22.1)	58.3 (14.6)	47.0 (8.3)	70.4 (21.3)
Daily mean °F (°C)	34.1 (1.2)	38.0 (3.3)	47.5 (8.6)	56.9 (13.8)	67.0 (19.4)	77.6 (25.3)	82.0 (27.8)	80.0 (26.7)	71.7 (22.1)	58.5 (14.7)	45.6 (7.6)	35.5 (1.9)	57.9 (14.4)
Mean daily minimum °F (°C)	22.0 (−5.6)	25.6 (−3.6)	34.7 (1.5)	43.8 (6.6)	54.6 (12.6)	65.0 (18.3)	69.5 (20.8)	67.6 (19.8)	59.1 (15.1)	45.2 (7.3)	32.9 (0.5)	24.0 (−4.4)	45.3 (7.4)
Mean minimum °F (°C)	5.1 (−14.9)	7.8 (−13.4)	16.0 (−8.9)	26.4 (−3.1)	37.9 (3.3)	52.3 (11.3)	59.2 (15.1)	57.1 (13.9)	41.8 (5.4)	27.2 (−2.7)	15.5 (−9.2)	7.2 (−13.8)	0.6 (−17.4)
Record low °F (°C)	−20 (−29)	−22 (−30)	−7 (−22)	14 (−10)	22 (−6)	39 (4)	47 (8)	40 (4)	29 (−2)	9 (−13)	0 (−18)	−18 (−28)	−22 (−30)
Average precipitation inches (mm)	0.80 (20)	1.03 (26)	2.03 (52)	2.43 (62)	3.65 (93)	3.93 (100)	3.13 (80)	3.51 (89)	2.61 (66)	2.44 (62)	1.10 (28)	1.09 (28)	27.75 (706)
Average snowfall inches (cm)	2.1 (5.3)	4.0 (10)	0.8 (2.0)	0.1 (0.25)	0.0 (0.0)	0.0 (0.0)	0.0 (0.0)	0.0 (0.0)	0.0 (0.0)	0.0 (0.0)	0.3 (0.76)	2.1 (5.3)	9.4 (23.61)
Average precipitation days (≥ 0.01 in)	4.3	5.6	6.8	8.2	9.0	8.7	6.7	8.6	5.8	7.2	4.4	4.8	80.1
Average snowy days (≥ 0.1 in)	1.2	1.4	0.4	0.0	0.0	0.0	0.0	0.0	0.0	0.0	0.3	1.5	4.8
Source: NOAA

== Demographics ==
Historical population
Census	Pop.	Note	%±
1880	373		—
1890	1,095		193.6%
1900	917		−16.3%
1910	1,229		34.0%
1920	1,305		6.2%
1930	1,655		26.8%
1940	1,870		13.0%
1950	2,288		22.4%
1960	3,072		34.3%
1970	2,545		−17.2%
1980	2,384		−6.3%
1990	2,453		2.9%
2000	2,193		−10.6%
2010	2,009		−8.4%
2020	1,781		−11.3%
U.S. Decennial Census

=== 2020 census ===
As of the 2020 census, Medicine Lodge had a population of 1,781, with 806 households and 459 families. The population density was 1,486.6 per square mile (574.0/km^{2}). There were 997 housing units at an average density of 832.2 per square mile (321.3/km^{2}).

The median age was 41.0 years. 24.8% of residents were under the age of 18, 7.1% were from 18 to 24, 21.6% were from 25 to 44, 24.8% were from 45 to 64, and 21.6% were 65 years of age or older. For every 100 females there were 98.1 males, and for every 100 females age 18 and over there were 94.1 males age 18 and over.

0.0% of residents lived in urban areas, while 100.0% lived in rural areas.

There were 806 households in Medicine Lodge, of which 26.3% had children under the age of 18 living in them. Of all households, 43.2% were married-couple households, 23.2% were households with a male householder and no spouse or partner present, and 28.3% were households with a female householder and no spouse or partner present. About 40.1% of all households were made up of individuals and 19.5% had someone living alone who was 65 years of age or older.

There were 997 housing units, of which 19.2% were vacant. The homeowner vacancy rate was 1.9% and the rental vacancy rate was 14.8%.

Racial composition as of the 2020 census
Race	Number	Percent
White	1,597	89.7%
Black or African American	6	0.3%
American Indian and Alaska Native	27	1.5%
Asian	8	0.4%
Native Hawaiian and Other Pacific Islander	1	0.1%
Some other race	54	3.0%
Two or more races	88	4.9%
Hispanic or Latino (of any race)	102	5.7%

Demographic estimates

The 2016–2020 5-year American Community Survey estimates show that the average household size was 2.1 and the average family size was 2.6. The percent of those with a bachelor's degree or higher was estimated to be 12.6% of the population.

Income and poverty

The 2016–2020 5-year American Community Survey estimates show that the median household income was $48,052 (with a margin of error of +/- $5,097) and the median family income was $70,441 (+/- $15,748). Males had a median income of $42,644 (+/- $9,795) versus $24,038 (+/- $7,191) for females. The median income for those above 16 years old was $30,637 (+/- $3,653). Approximately, 13.7% of families and 17.7% of the population were below the poverty line, including 30.3% of those under the age of 18 and 9.8% of those ages 65 or over.

=== 2010 census ===
As of the census of 2010, there were 2,009 people, 876 households, and 530 families residing in the city. The population density was 1,660.3 inhabitants per square mile (641.0/km^{2}). There were 1,031 housing units at an average density of 852.1 per square mile (329.0/km^{2}). The racial makeup of the city was 96.3% White, 0.7% African American, 0.3% Native American, 0.4% Asian, 1.4% from other races, and 0.9% from two or more races. Hispanic or Latino of any race were 2.4% of the population.

There were 876 households, of which 29.5% had children under the age of 18 living with them, 46.3% were married couples living together, 8.4% had a female householder with no husband present, 5.7% had a male householder with no wife present, and 39.5% were non-families. 35.6% of all households were made up of individuals, and 14.9% had someone living alone who was 65 years of age or older. The average household size was 2.28 and the average family size was 2.93.

The median age in the city was 40 years. 25.6% of residents were under the age of 18; 7% were between the ages of 18 and 24; 22.4% were from 25 to 44; 27.3% were from 45 to 64; and 17.9% were 65 years of age or older. The gender makeup of the city was 50.7% male and 49.3% female.

== Economy ==
- National Gypsum

== Government ==
Medicine Lodge has a mayor-council form of government. The city council consists of five members, who are elected on a rotating schedule. The day-to-day operations of city government are managed by a City Administrator who operates under the supervision of the elected officials. The current City Administrator is Brian Daily who started in November 2022.

== Education ==
Barber County North USD 254 (a unified school district), which covers Medicine Lodge, provides public primary and secondary education with two schools in Medicine Lodge: Medicine Lodge Grade School (Grades Pre-K-6) and Medicine Lodge Junior-Senior High School (7-12).

== Transportation ==
U.S. Route 281, which runs north-south, and U.S. Route 160, which runs east-west, intersect in the southwest corner of the city.

Medicine Lodge Airport, which hosts general aviation, is located approximately 1.5 miles (2.4 km) southeast of the city.

Medicine Lodge is the western terminus of the Medicine Lodge line of the V&S Railway. The rail line runs northwest-southeast through the southwestern part of the city.

== Media ==
=== Print ===
Newspapers

- The Gyp Hill Premiere, weekly

=== Radio ===
The following radio stations are licensed to Medicine Lodge:

FM

Frequency	Callsign	Format	Notes
91.5	KSNS	Contemporary Christian	-
101.7	KREJ	Christian	-

== Culture ==
Triennially, Medicine Lodge holds a pageant to commemorate the 1867 Medicine Lodge Treaty, signed near the city's present-day location. The city first held the pageant in 1927 and has held it every three years since 1961.

=== Area attractions ===
- Carrie Nation House
- Stockade House.
- Peace Treaty Statue, located on North Main Street.
- Wisner Fountain, originally used to water horses on North Main Street.
- Kansas Historical Marker - Medicine Lodge Peace Treaties, located 1 mile east of Medicine Lodge.

== Notable people ==
- Carleton Beals (1893–1979), journalist, author, historian, political activist
- B. H. Born (1932–2013), All American basketball player
- Dorothy DeLay (1917–2002), violin instructor at Juilliard, Sarah Lawrence College, University of Cincinnati.
- Edward Hunkeler (1894–1970), Roman Catholic Archbishop
- Chester Long (1860–1934), U.S. Representative and U.S. Senator from Kansas
- Carrie Nation (1846–1911), radical member of the temperance movement
- Jerry Simpson (1842–1905), U.S. Representative from Kansas
- Jasper Tincher (1878–1951), U.S. Representative from Kansas
