= Carry Nation Home =

Historic house in Kansas, United States

- U.S. National Register of Historic Places
- U.S. National Historic Landmark
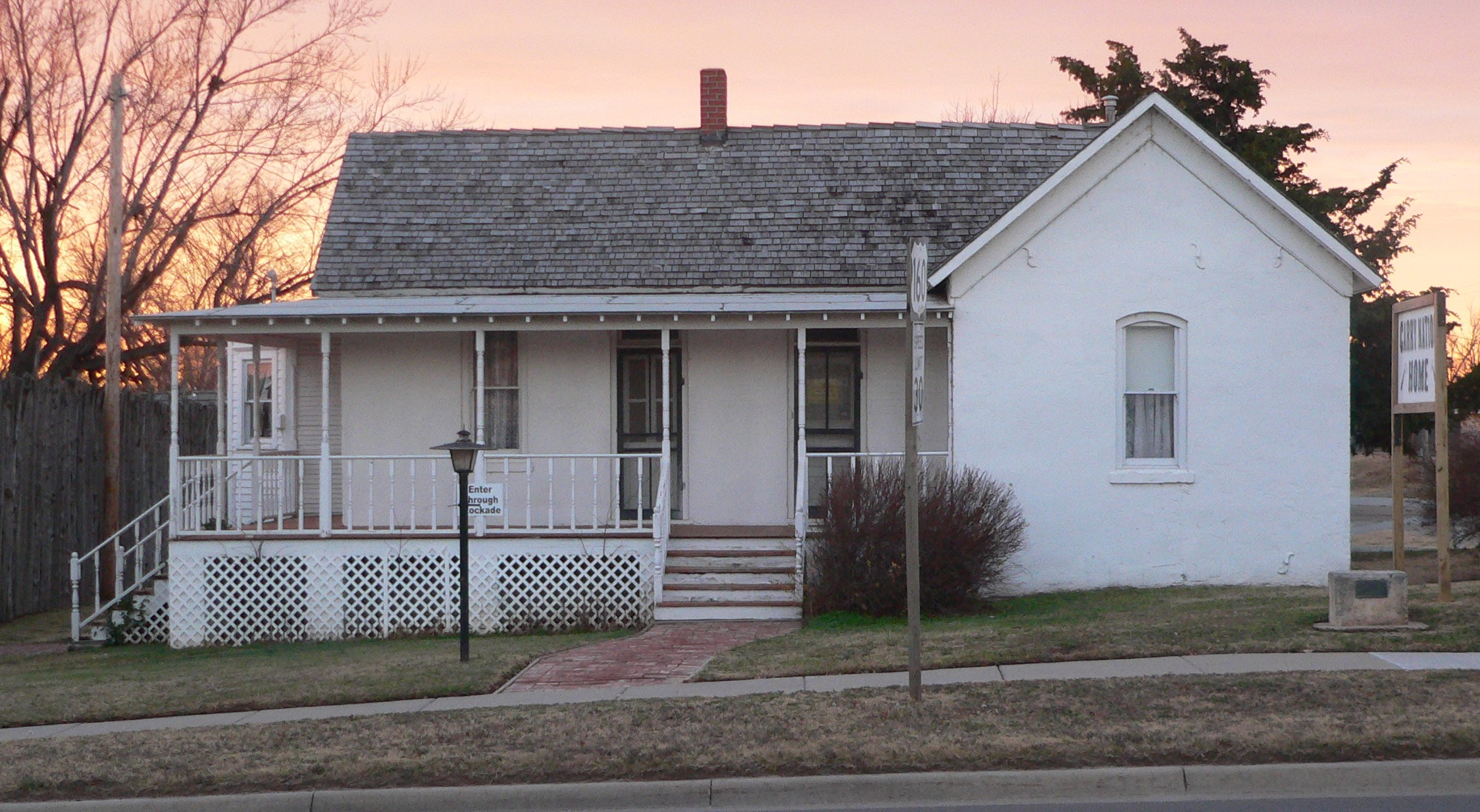

- Location within Kansas Location within the United States
- Location: 211 W. Fowler Ave., Medicine Lodge, Kansas
- Coordinates: 37.275620°N 98.581998°W
- Built: c. 1889
- NRHP reference No.: 71000303

Significant dates
- Added to NRHP: March 24, 1971
- Designated NHL: May 11, 1976

The Carrie Nation Home in Medicine Lodge, Kansas, also known as Carry A. Nation Home and Museum, was a home of temperance movement leader Carrie A. Nation. It is one of two houses listed for Carry A. Nation on the U.S. National Register of Historic Places; the other is the Carry A. Nation House in Lancaster, Garrard County, Kentucky.

== History ==
Carrie Nation lived in this small brick house, at 211 W. Fowler Ave. (US 160), at the corner with Oak Street, in Medicine Lodge, from 1889 to 1902. In 1899 she received a "heavenly vision" to go to the nearby town of Kiowa, where she wrecked three saloons as part of her crusade against consumption of alcoholic beverages.

On the 5th of June, 1899, before retiring, I threw myself face downward at the foot of my bed in my home in Medicine Lodge. I poured out my grief and agony to God, in about this strain : "Oh Lord you see the treason in Kansas, they are going to break the mothers' hearts, they are going to send the boys to drunkards' graves and a drunkard's hell. I have exhausted all my means. Oh Lord, you have plenty of ways. You have used the base things and the weak things, use me to save Kansas. I have but one life to give you, if I had a thousand, I would give them all, please show me something to do." The next morning I was awakened by a voice which seemed to be speaking in my heart, these words, "GO TO KIOWA," and my hands were lifted and thrown down and the words, "I'LL STAND BY YOU." The words, "Go to Kiowa,' were spoken in a murmuring, musical tone, low and soft, but, "I'll stand by you," was very clear, positive and emphatic. I was impressed with a great inspiration, the interpretation was very plain, it was this : "Take something in your hands, and throw at these places in Kiowa and smash them." I was very much relieved and overjoyed and was determined to be, "obedient to the heavenly vision." (Acts 26 :19.)

— Carry A. Nation

Subsequently, in 1902, she sold the house and used the sale proceeds to open a home in Kansas City for the wives of drunkards.

The building was bought by the Women's Christian Temperance Union in the 1950s. It was declared a National Historic Landmark in 1976.

The house is located next to a reproduction of an 1874 stockade that was used to protect settlers against attack from Native Americans. The actual stockade was much larger and located to the northeast, near the center of town. The reproduction was built as a commercial venture in 1961, but closed due to financial problems in 1982. Since then it has reopened as the Medicine Lodge Stockade Museum.

Tickets to the stockade museum also include entrance to the Carrie Nation Home.

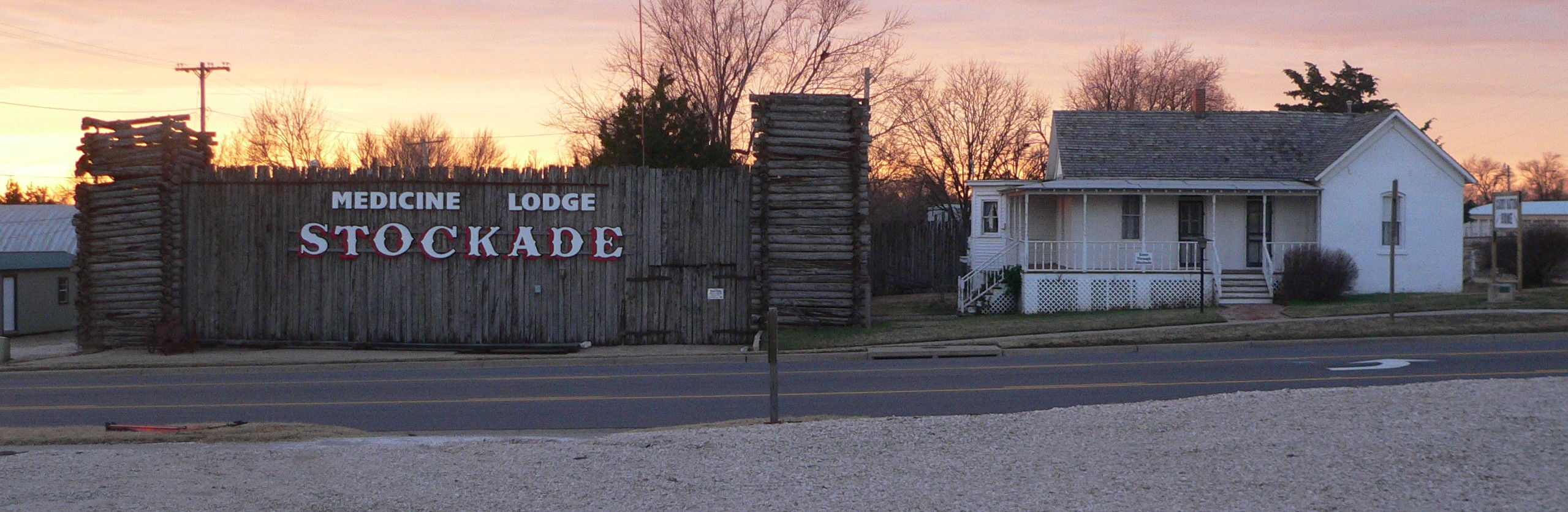
Stockade Museum and Carry Nation Home

The 1975 NRHP nomination states "The house suffers though, from proximity to the Medicine Lodge Stockade Museum, a touristy replica of a fort."
