= Carrie Nation =

American temperance advocate (1846–1911)

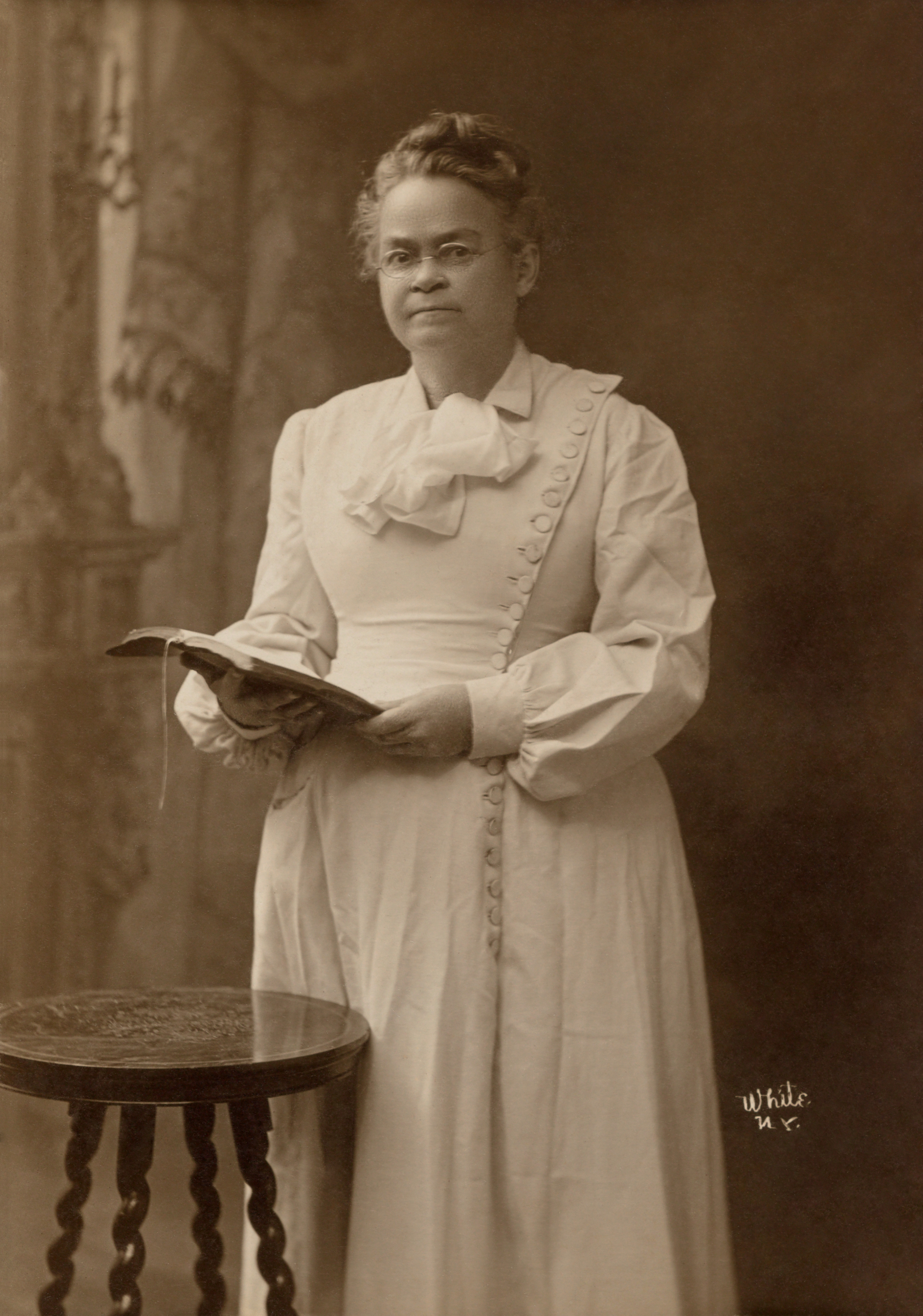
- Nation in 1903
- Born: Caroline Amelia Moore; November 25, 1846; Garrard County, Kentucky, U.S.
- Died: June 9, 1911 (aged 64); Leavenworth, Kansas, U.S.
- Resting place: Belton Cemetery; Belton, Missouri
- Other name: Carry A. Nation
- Education: Normal Institute
- Spouses: Charles Gloyd (m. 1867; died 1869); David A. Nation (m. 1874; div. 1901)
- Children: 1
- Relatives: Carleton Beals, grandson

Caroline Amelia Nation (November 25, 1846 – June 9, 1911), often referred to as Carrie, Carry Nation, Carrie A. Nation, or Hatchet Granny, was a radical of the American temperance movement, which opposed alcohol consumption before the advent of Prohibition. Nation is noted for attacking alcohol-serving establishments (most often taverns) with a hatchet. She was previously known by her birth name Carrie Moore, then as Carrie Gloyd upon her first marriage in 1867, before she married David Nation in 1874.

She described herself as "a bulldog running along at the feet of Jesus, barking at what He doesn't like", and claimed a divine ordination to promote temperance by destroying bars. She was known as "Mother Nation" for her charity and religious work, which she thought of as an extension of her fight against drunkenness. In 1890, Nation founded a sewing circle in Medicine Lodge, Kansas to make clothing for the poor as well as prepare meals for them on holidays like Thanksgiving and Christmas. In 1901, Nation established a shelter for wives and children of alcoholics in Kansas City, Missouri. This shelter would later be described as an "early model for today's battered women's shelter".

In her autobiography, The Use and Need of the Life of Carry A. Nation (1908), she also strongly opposed Freemasonry. Nation also fought against the fashion for corsets that constricted women's vital organs.

== Early life and first marriage ==
Caroline Amelia Moore (Note: The spelling of Nation's first name varies; both "Carrie" and "Carry" are considered correct. Official records say "Carrie", which Nation used for most of her life; the name "Carry" was used by her father in the family Bible. Upon beginning her campaign against liquor in the early 20th century, she adopted the name Carry A. Nation, saying it meant "Carry A Nation for Prohibition." After gaining her notoriety, Carrie officially registered "Carry" as a trademark.) was born in Garrard County, Kentucky, to George Moore and Mary Campbell. Her father was a successful farmer, stock trader, and slaveholder. During much of her early life, her health was poor, and her family experienced financial setbacks. The family moved several times in Kentucky and finally settled in Belton, Missouri in 1854.

In addition to their financial difficulties, many of Moore's family members had mental illnesses; her mother, at times, had delusions. There is speculation that the family did not stay in one place long because of rumors about Mary Moore's mental state. Indeed, some writers have speculated that Mary believed she was Queen Victoria because of her finery and social airs. Mary lived in an insane asylum in Nevada, Missouri, from August 1890 until her death on September 28, 1893. Mary was put in the asylum through legal action by her son, Charles, although there is suspicion that Charles instigated the lawsuit because he owed Mary money.

The family moved to Texas as Missouri became involved in the Civil War in 1862. George did not fare well in Texas, and he moved his family back to Missouri. The family returned to High Grove Farm in Cass County. When the Union Army ordered them to evacuate their farm, they moved to Kansas City. Carrie nursed wounded soldiers after a raid on Independence, Missouri. The family again returned to their farm when the Civil War ended.

In 1865, Carrie met Charles Gloyd, a young physician who had fought for the Union and was a severe alcoholic. Gloyd taught school near the Moores' farm while deciding where to establish his medical practice. He eventually settled in Holden, Missouri, and asked Moore to marry him. Moore's parents objected to the union because they believed he was addicted to alcohol, but the marriage proceeded. They were married on November 21, 1867, and separated shortly before the birth of their daughter, Charlien, on September 27, 1868. Gloyd died in 1869 of alcoholism.

Influenced by the death of her husband, Carrie Gloyd developed a passionate activism against alcohol. With the proceeds from selling her inherited land (as well as that of her husband's estate), she built a small house in Holden. Gloyd moved there with her mother-in-law and Charlien, and attended the Normal Institute in Warrensburg, Missouri, earning her teaching certificate in July 1872. Gloyd taught at a school in Holden for four years. She obtained a history degree and studied the influence of Greek philosophers on American politics.

== Second marriage and "call from God" ==
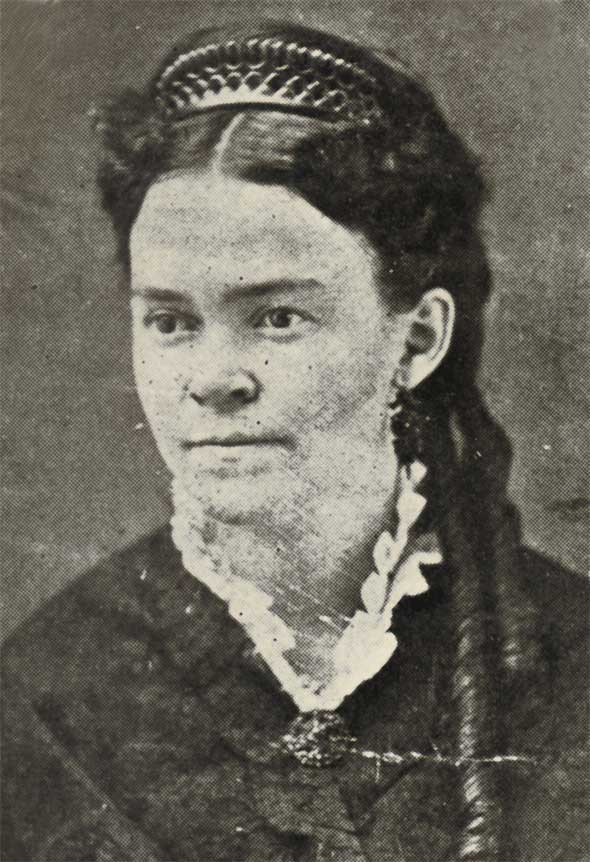
Carrie Nation after her marriage to David Nation on December 30, 1874 (age 28)

In 1874, Carrie Gloyd married David A. Nation, an attorney, minister, newspaper journalist, and father who was 19 years her senior.

The family purchased a 1,700 acre (690 ha) cotton plantation on the San Bernard River in Brazoria County, Texas. As neither knew much about farming, the venture was ultimately unsuccessful. They moved to Brazoria for David Nation to practice law. In about 1880, they moved to Columbia (now East Columbia) to operate the hotel owned by A. R. and Jesse W. Park. Her name is on the roll of Columbia Methodist Church in West Columbia. She lived at the hotel with her daughter, Charlien Gloyd, "Mother Gloyd" (Carrie's first mother-in-law), and David's daughter, Lola. Carrie Nation's husband also operated a saddle shop just southwest of this site. The family soon moved to Richmond, Texas, to operate a hotel.

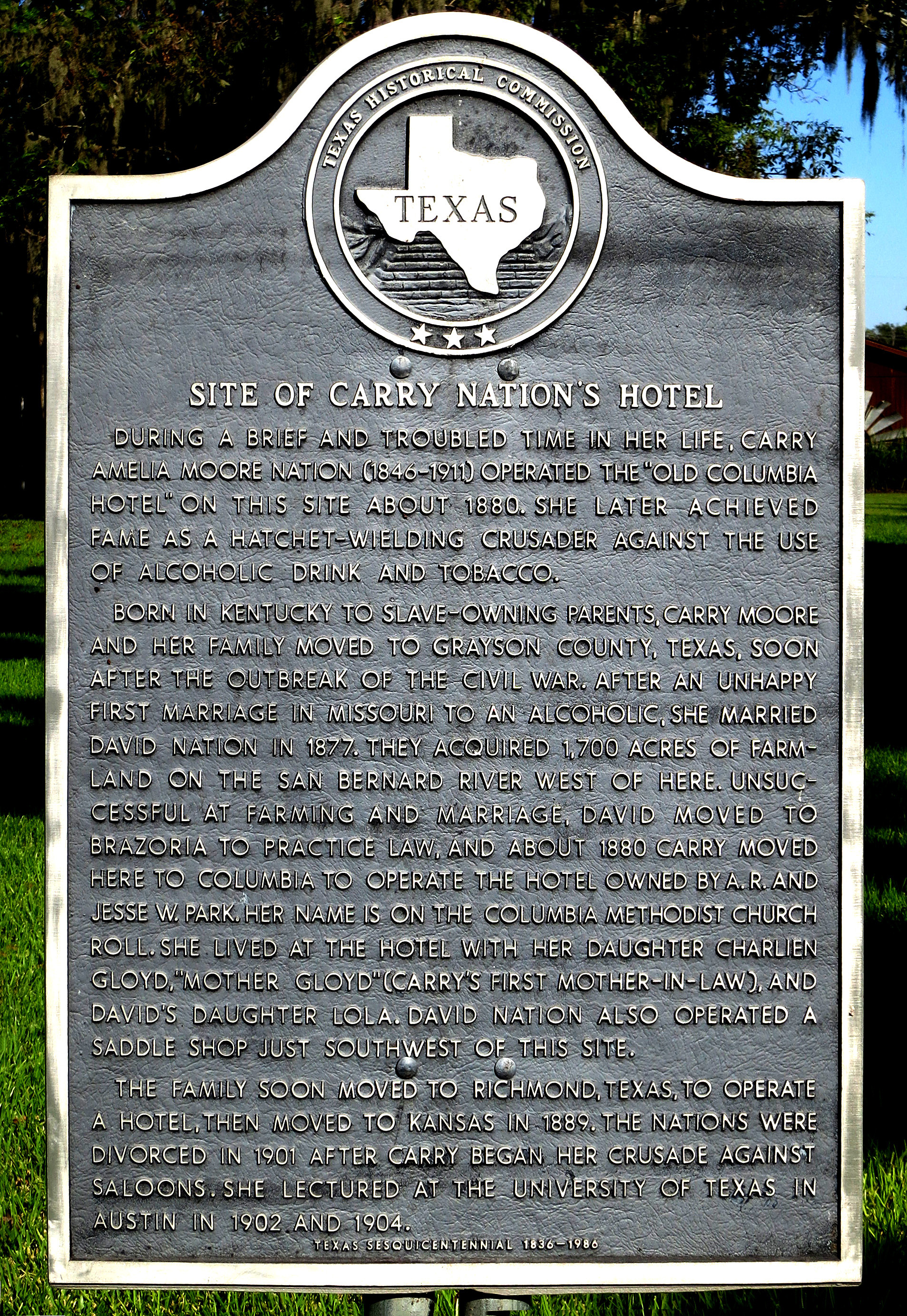
Texas Historical Marker for the site of Carry Nation's hotel in East Columbia, Texas

Carrie Nation began her temperance work in Medicine Lodge by starting a local branch of the Woman's Christian Temperance Union and campaigning for the enforcement of Kansas' ban on the sale of liquor. Her methods escalated from simple protests to serenading saloon patrons with hymns accompanied by a hand organ, to greeting bartenders with pointed remarks such as, "Good morning, destroyer of men's souls." Dissatisfied with the results of her efforts, Nation began to pray to God for direction. On June 5, 1900, she felt she received her answer in the form of a heavenly vision. As she described it:

The next morning I was awakened by a voice which seemed to me speaking in my heart, these words, "GO TO KIOWA," and my hands were lifted and thrown down and the words, "I'LL STAND BY YOU." The words, "Go to Kiowa," were spoken in a murmuring, musical tone, low and soft, but "I'll stand by you," was very clear, positive and emphatic. I was impressed with a great inspiration, the interpretation was very plain, it was this: "Take something in your hands, and throw at these places in Kiowa and smash them."

Responding to the revelation, Nation gathered several rocks – "smashers", she called them – and proceeded to Dobson's Saloon on June 7. Announcing "Men, I have come to save you from a drunkard's fate", she began to destroy the saloon's stock with her cache of rocks. After she similarly destroyed two other saloons in Kiowa, a tornado hit eastern Kansas, which Nation took as divine approval of her actions.

== Hatchetations ==
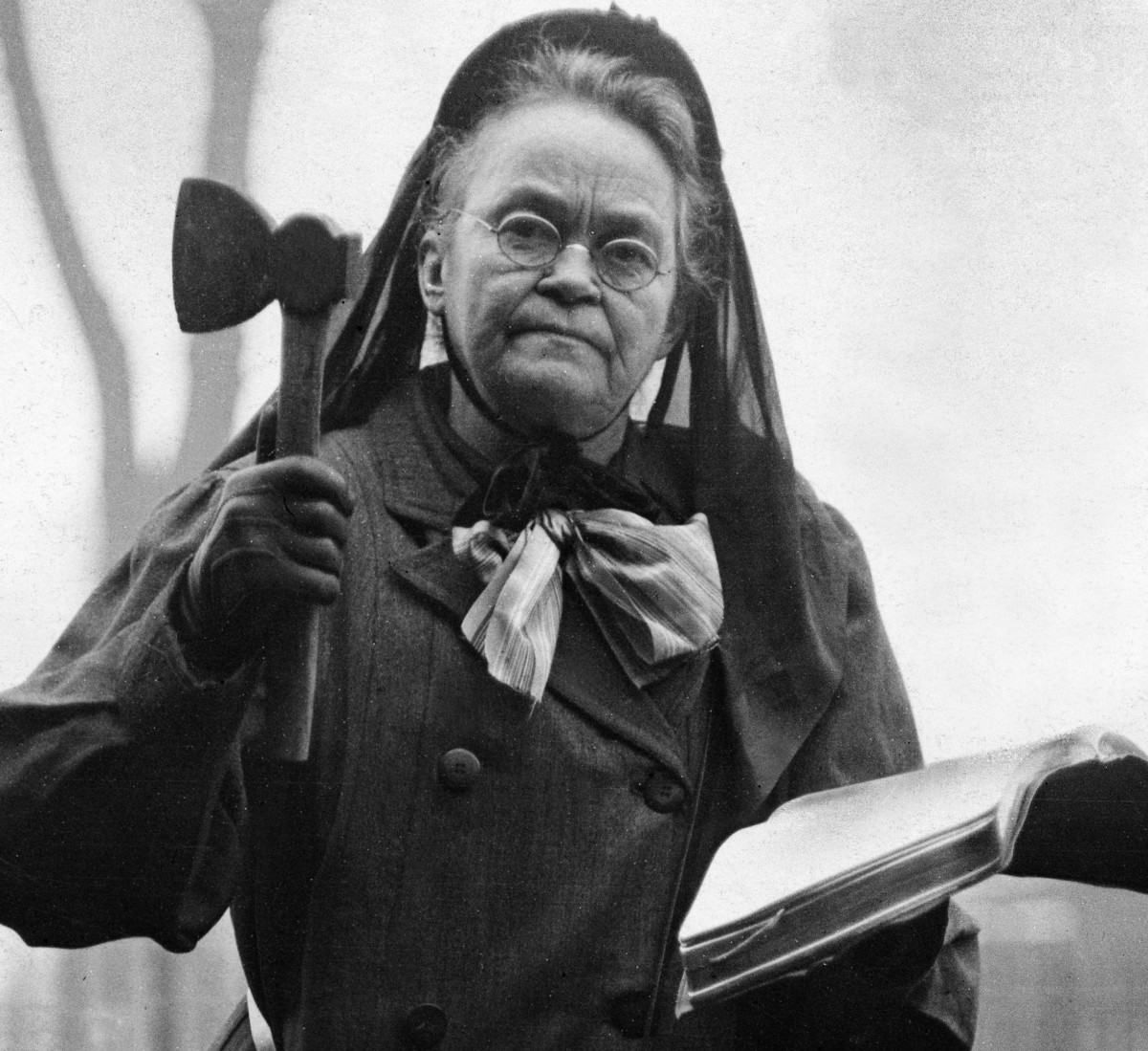
Nation holding a hatchet and Bible, c. 1900

Carrie Nation continued her saloon destruction, her fame spreading through her growing arrest record. After she led a raid in Wichita, Kansas, Nation's husband joked that she should use a hatchet next time for maximum damage. Nation replied, "That is the most sensible thing you have said since I married you." The couple divorced in 1901; they had no children. Between 1902 and 1906, she lived in Guthrie, Oklahoma.

Alone or accompanied by hymn-singing women, Nation would march into a bar and sing and pray while smashing bar fixtures and stock with a hatchet. Between 1900 and 1910, she was arrested at least 32 times for "hatchetations", as she came to call them. Nation paid her jail fines from lecture-tour fees and sales of stick pins in the shape of hatchets. The souvenirs were provided by a pharmacist from Topeka, Kansas.

In April 1901, Nation went to Kansas City, Missouri, a city known for its wide opposition to the temperance movement, and smashed liquor in various bars on 12th Street in downtown Kansas City. She was arrested, taken to court, and fined $500 (equivalent to $19,400 in 2025) although the judge suspended the fine under the condition that she never return to Kansas City. Reportedly she was placed in the Washington, D.C., poorhouse for three days for refusing to pay a $35 fine.

Nation also conducted women's rights marches in Topeka, Kansas. She led hundreds of women who were part of the Home Defender's Army to march in opposition to saloons. In Amarillo, Texas, she received a strong response, as she was sponsored by the surveyor W. D. Twichell, an active Methodist layman.

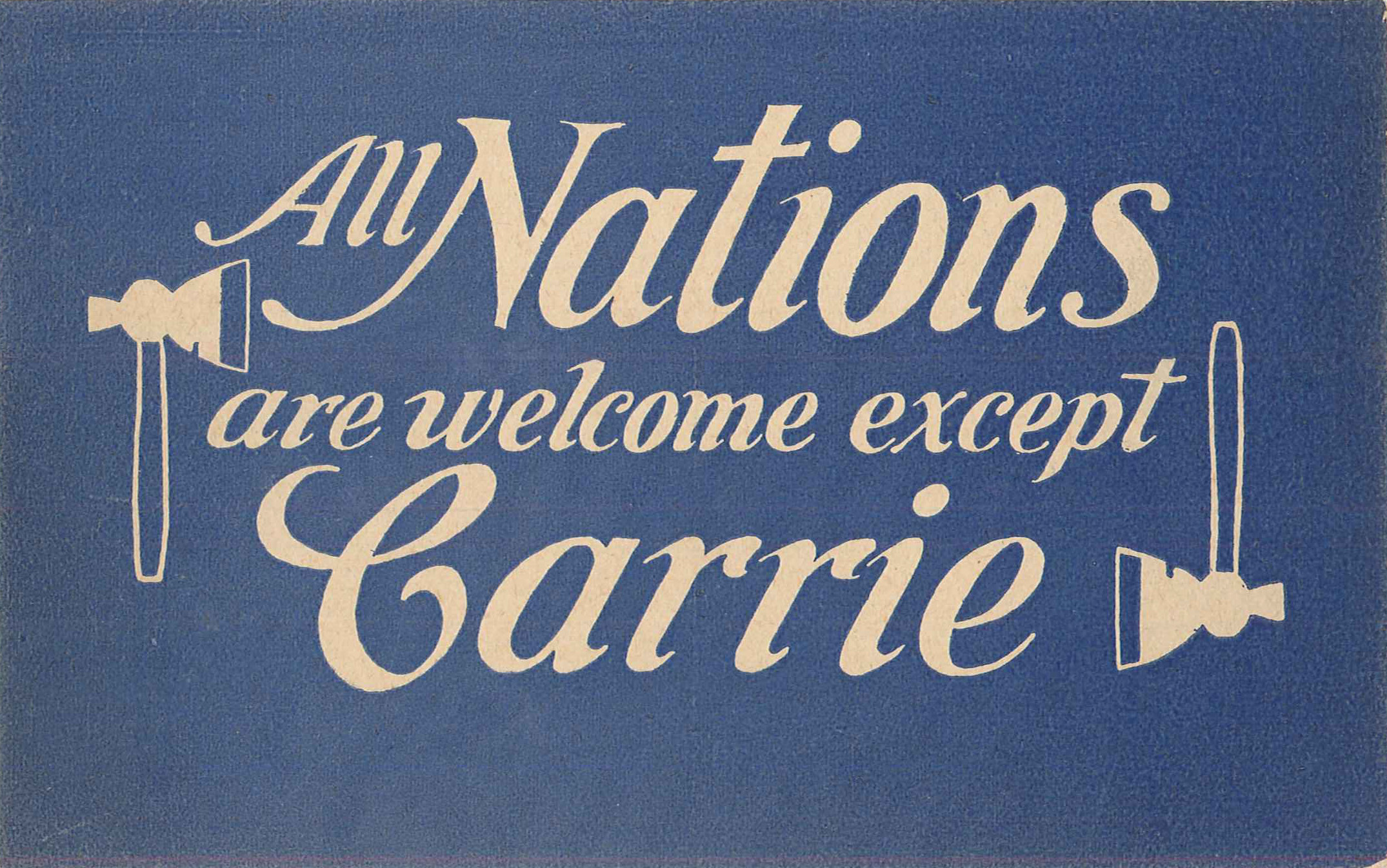
A postcard from around 1910

Nation's anti-alcohol activities became widely known, with the slogan "All Nations Welcome But Carrie" becoming a bar-room staple. She published The Smasher's Mail, a biweekly newsletter, and The Hatchet, a newspaper.

== Later life and death ==
Later in life Nation exploited her name by appearing in vaudeville in the United States and music halls in Great Britain. Nation, a proud woman more given to sermonizing than entertaining, found these venues uninspiring for her proselytizing. One of a number of pre-World War I acts that "failed to click" with foreign audiences, Nation was struck by an egg thrown by an audience member during one 1909 music hall lecture at the Canterbury Theatre of Varieties in Westminster, London. Indignantly, "The Anti-Souse Queen" ripped up her contract and returned to the United States. Seeking profits elsewhere, Nation sold photographs of herself, collected lecture fees, and marketed miniature souvenir hatchets. In October 1909, various press outlets reported that Nation claimed to have invented an aeroplane.

Near the end of her life, Nation moved to Eureka Springs, Arkansas, where she founded the home known as "Hatchet Hall". She gave her final speech on January 14, 1911, collapsing mid-way through, having previously suffered health problems. Nation fell into a coma and was taken to Evergreen Place Hospital in Leavenworth, Kansas, where she eventually died on June 9, 1911. She was buried in the southeastern side of Belton Cemetery in Belton, Missouri. The Woman's Christian Temperance Union later erected a stone inscribed "Faithful to the Cause of Prohibition, She Hath Done What She Could" and the name "Carry A. Nation".

== Legacy ==
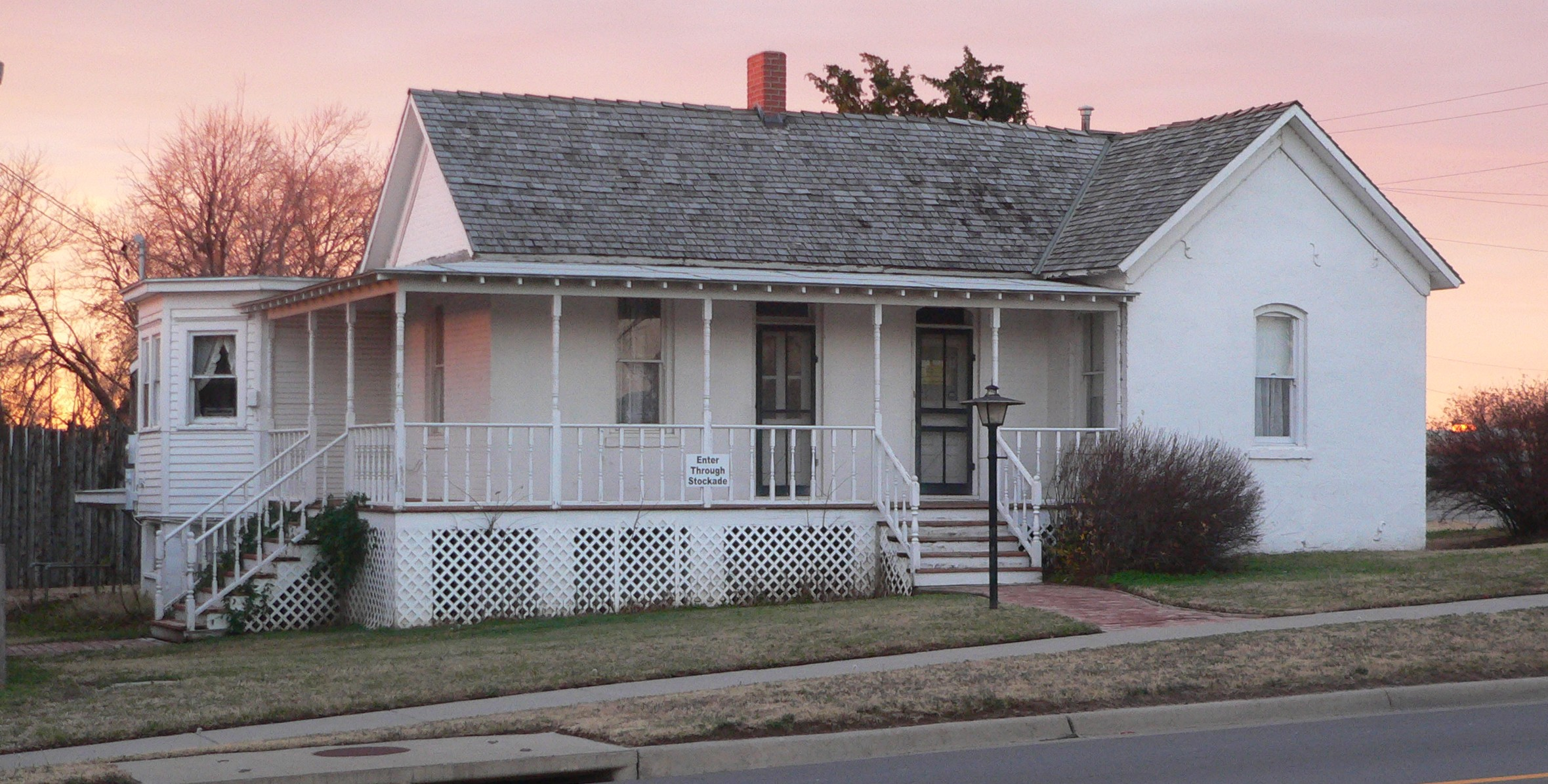
Carrie Nation House in Medicine Lodge, Kansas

In 1918, a drinking fountain was erected in Nation's memory by the Woman's Christian Temperance Union. It is located at Naftzger Memorial Park in Wichita, Kansas. One myth is that the fountain was nearly destroyed at one time by a beer truck hitting it; Jamie Tracy, a curator of the Wichita-Sedgwick County Historical Museum, has not found any evidence for this ironic tale. In July 2018 a life-size bronze statue of Nation was erected in front of the Eaton Hotel (at the time called the Carey Hotel), the location of her raid in Wichita, Kansas.

The play Carry Nation ran on Broadway and starred Esther Dale. Beverly Wolff performed the title role in the opera Carry Nation. Nation was portrayed by Valerie Buhagiar in Season 9 Episode 6 of the Canadian TV series Murdoch Mysteries. In "Bar Fights" (Episode 3, Season 4) of Comedy Central's Drunk History, Nation is portrayed by Vanessa Bayer. A fictionalized version of Nation is portrayed in the musical Queen of the Mist, wherein she crosses paths with Annie Edson Taylor. Nation was portrayed by Julia Murney in the original Off-Broadway production.

In the satirical musical melodrama Beyond the Valley of the Dolls the band the Kelly Affair change their name to the Carrie Nations. In the Kurt Vonnegut story, Welcome to the Monkey House, the fictional J. Edgar Nation's name is a mixture made up from J. Edgar Hoover and Carrie Nation. F.B.I. director Hoover "was vigorous in his moral judgments." Nation's message is also present through the character Nancy McLuhan, who is convinced that gin is the worst drug of all. DJs Nita Aviance and Will Automagic formed the duo The Carry Nation.

Neil Munro gives a satirical account of an encounter with Carrie Nation in his Erchie MacPherson story, "Erchie and Carrie", first published in the Glasgow Evening News of December 14, 1908. In 1977 Gary Dahl, inventor of the Pet Rock, used his proceeds from that fad to renovate and open a bar in Los Gatos, California which he jokingly named "Carrie Nation's Saloon". Broken Hatchet Brewing, a microbrewery in Belton, Missouri, is named in her honor.

Carry A. Nation House in Kentucky was a home of Carrie Nation, and was a 10-room house then. It is now listed on the National Register of Historic Places in Garrard County, Kentucky, United States. It was built in 1846. Nation's home in Medicine Lodge, Kansas, the Carrie Nation House, was declared a U.S. National Historic Landmark in 1976.
