= Carry A. Nation House (Kentucky) =

Historic house in Kentucky, United States

- U.S. National Register of Historic Places
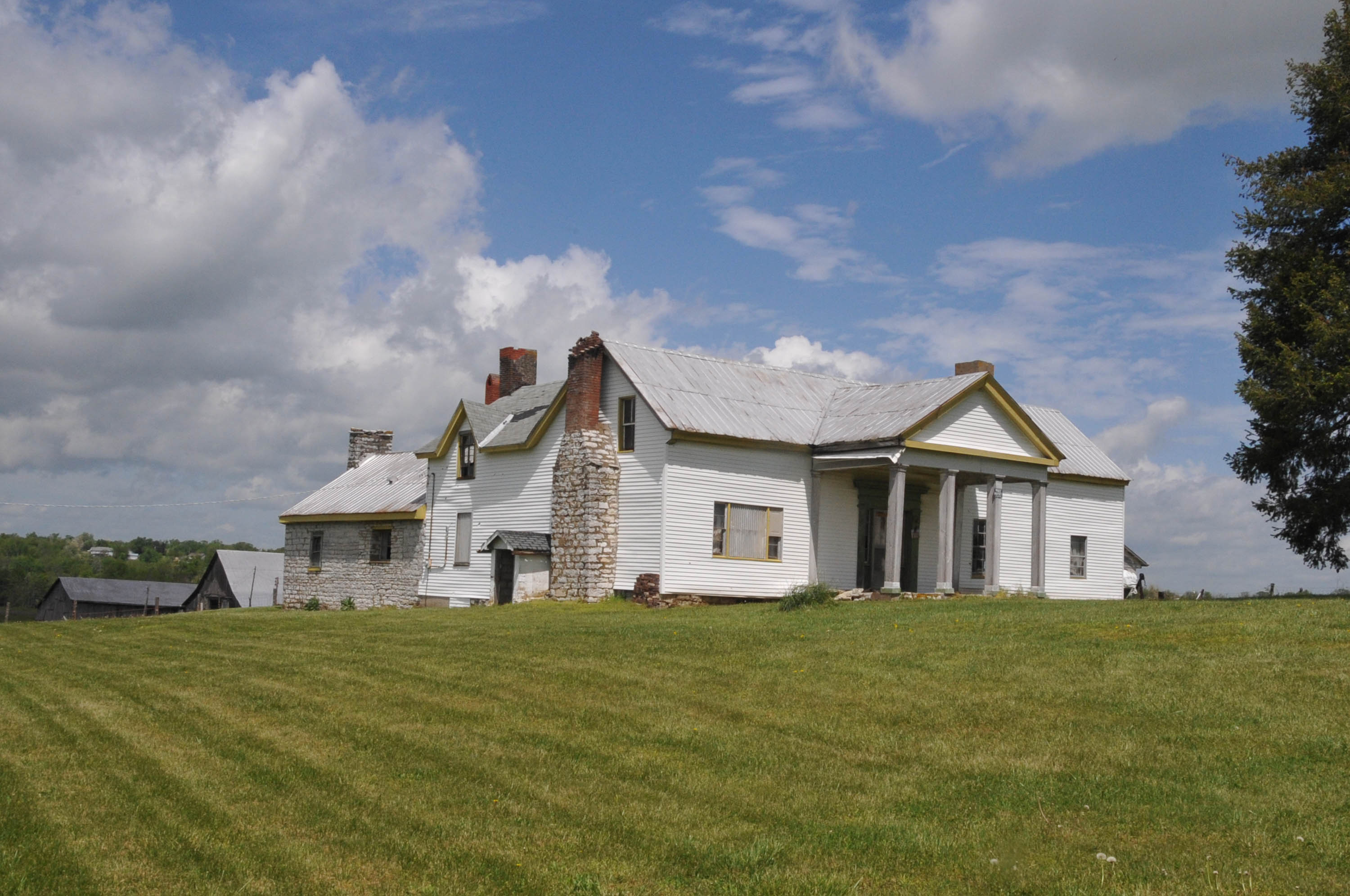

- Location within Kentucky Location within the United States
- Nearest city: Lancaster, Kentucky
- Coordinates: 37.7111627°N 84.7302857°W
- Area: 1.5 acres (0.61 ha)
- Built: 1846
- NRHP reference No.: 77000620
- Added to NRHP: December 16, 1977

Carry A. Nation House near Lancaster, Kentucky is listed on the National Register of Historic Places in Garrard County, Kentucky, United States. It was built in 1846.

It was a home of Carrie Nation, and was a 10-room house then.

== See also ==
- Carrie Nation House (Kansas)
