= Eleonora Vallone =

Italian actress, model, and television personality

Eleonora Vallone (born 1 February 1955) is an Italian actress, model and TV-personality.

Born in Rome, the daughter of actors Raf Vallone and Elena Varzi, she made her film debut in 1979 in the "poliziottesco" Gardenia, and later starred in several genre films, also in the more ambitious Alberto Bevilacqua drama film Le rose di Danzica. In 1981 she hosted the Sanremo Music Festival alongside Claudio Cecchetto. In the same years she appeared nude in several men's magazines such as Playmen and the Italian edition of Playboy.

A pioneer and teacher of water gymnastics, Eleonora Vallone founded the first Italian school for water aerobics instructors, and she patented the method "GymNuoto". She also wrote three books about waterobics, "GymNuoto", "GymVasca" and "GymSwim".
