= Elena Varzi =

Italian film actress

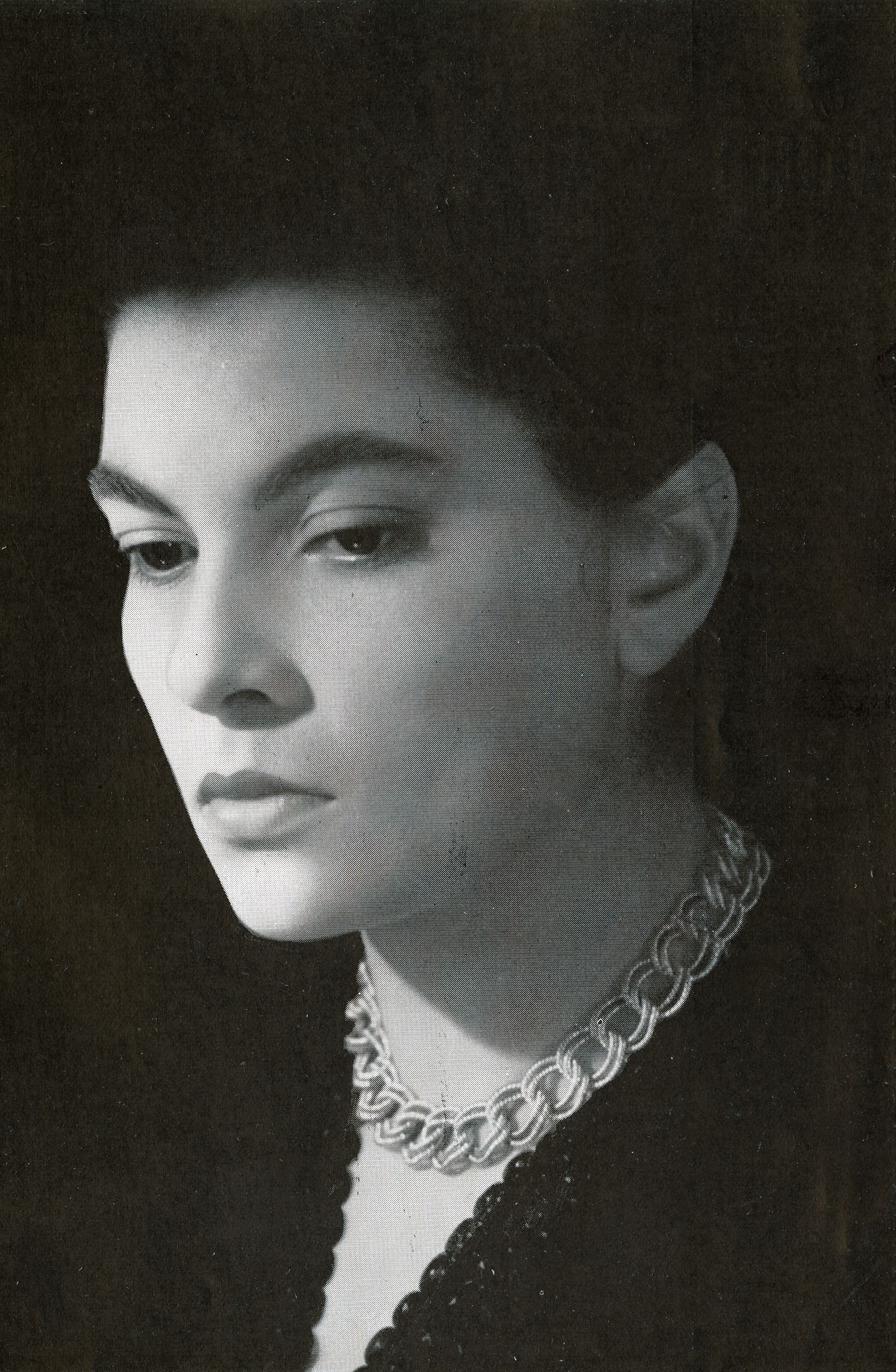
- Varzi in the Italian magazine Cineguida (1954)
- Born: 21 December 1926; Rome, Italy
- Died: 1 September 2014 (aged 87); Sperlonga, Italy
- Occupation: Actress
- Spouse: Raf Vallone (m. 1952; died 2002)
- Children: Arabella Vallone; Saverio Vallone; Eleonora Vallone

Elena Varzi (21 December 1926 – 1 September 2014) was an Italian film actress.

== Life and career ==
Born in Rome, in spite of a non-professional acting background, Varzi made her film debut in a leading role, as the Sicilian Maria Antonia in Renato Castellani's neorealist post-war comedy-drama It's Forever Springtime. Her second role, as the mistress of a Sicilian bandit in Pietro Germi's Path of Hope, received critical acclaim. It was during filming The Forbidden Christ that Varzi met and later married Raf Vallone. She eventually left her film career, devoting herself to the family. She was the mother of Arabella, Saverio, and Eleonora Vallone. Her husband died in 2002.

== Death ==
Varzi died of cardiac arrest at her holiday cottage in Sperlonga, Latina, on 1 September 2014. She was 87.

== Partial filmography ==
- It's Forever Springtime (1950)
- Path of Hope (1950)
- The Forbidden Christ (1951)
- Rome 11:00 (1952)
- The Eyes Leave a Trace (1952)
- Sunday Heroes (1952)
- Human Torpedoes (1954)
- Storm (1954)
