= Storm (1954 film) =

1954 film

- French film poster
- Directed by: Pierre Billon; Giorgio Capitani
- Written by: Pierre Billon; Michel Audiard; Vittorio Calvino; Giorgio Capitani
- Based on: Le Venin by Henri Bernstein
- Produced by: Leo Menardi
- Starring: Raf Vallone; Françoise Arnoul; Elena Varzi
- Cinematography: Gábor Pogány
- Edited by: Renzo Lucidi
- Music by: Renzo Rossellini
- Production companies: Bellotti Film; Société Générale de Cinématographie
- Distributed by: Cocinor
- Release date: 17 April 1954
- Running time: 100 minutes
- Countries: France; Italy
- Language: French

Storm (French: Orage, Italian: Delirio) is a 1954 French-Italian melodrama film directed by Pierre Billon and Giorgio Capitani and starring Raf Vallone, Françoise Arnoul and Elena Varzi. The film's sets were designed by the art director Mario Chiari. It is based on the play Le Venin by Henri Bernstein, which had previously been made into the 1938 film Orage.

== Synopsis ==
The engineer André goes to see his brother-in-law's lover Françoise to try and warn her off. However, despite being in love with his wife Elena, he finds himself falling for Françoise

== Cast ==
- Raf Vallone as André
- Françoise Arnoul as Françoise
- Elena Varzi as Elena
- Ave Ninchi as Cecilia
- Giorgio Albertazzi as Il coloniale
- Aldo Silvani as Padre di Andrea
- Andrea Valle as Gilberto
- Ferdinando Cappabianca as Giorgio
- Annette Ciarli as Portinaia

== Bibliography ==
- Gili, Jean A. & Tassone, Aldo. Parigi-Roma: 50 anni di coproduzioni italo-francesi (1945-1995). Editrice Il castoro, 1995.
