= Tovarich (film) =

1937 film

- 1937 US Theatrical Poster
- Directed by: Anatole Litvak
- Written by: Casey Robinson; Jacques Deval (play); Robert E. Sherwood
- Produced by: Anatole Litvak
- Starring: Claudette Colbert; Charles Boyer; Basil Rathbone; Anita Louise
- Cinematography: Charles Lang
- Edited by: Henri Rust
- Music by: Max Steiner
- Production company: Warner Bros. Pictures
- Distributed by: Warner Bros. Pictures
- Release date: December 25, 1937
- Running time: 98 minutes
- Country: United States
- Language: English

Tovarich (the Russian word for "comrade" or "friend") is a 1937 American comedy film directed by Anatole Litvak, based on the 1935 play by Robert E. Sherwood, which in turn was based on the 1933 French play Tovaritch by Jacques Deval. It was produced by Litvak through Warner Bros., with Robert Lord as associate producer and Hal B. Wallis and Jack L. Warner as executive producers. The screenplay was by Casey Robinson from the French play by Jacques Deval adapted into English by Robert E. Sherwood. The music score was by Max Steiner and the cinematography by Charles Lang.

The film stars Claudette Colbert and Charles Boyer with Basil Rathbone, Anita Louise, Melville Cooper, Isabel Jeans, Morris Carnovsky and Curt Bois in his American debut role.

== Plot ==
Russian Prince Mikail Alexandrovitch Ouratieff (Charles Boyer) and his wife, Grand Duchess Tatiana Petrovna (Claudette Colbert) flee from the Russian Revolution to Paris with the Czar's fortune, which he has entrusted to them for safekeeping. They keep the money in a bank, faithfully refusing to spend any of it for themselves. Then, destitute, they are forced to take jobs under false identities as butler and maid in the household of wealthy Charles Dupont (Melville Cooper), his wife Fermonde (Isabel Jeans), and their children, Helene (Anita Louise) and Georges (Maurice Murphy). After a shaky start, the servants gradually endear themselves to their employers. However, their secret is finally exposed when one of the guests at a dinner party, Madame Chauffourier-Dubleff (Doris Lloyd), recognises them.

== Cast ==
- Claudette Colbert as Grand Duchess Tatiana Petrovna Romanov
- Charles Boyer as Prince Mikail Alexandrovitch Ouratieff
- Basil Rathbone as Commissar Dimitri Gorotchenko
- Anita Louise as Helene Dupont
- Melville Cooper as Charles Dupont
- Isabel Jeans as Hermonde Dupont
- Morris Carnovsky as Chauffourier Dubieff
- Victor Kilian as Gendarme
- Maurice Murphy as Georges Dupont
- Gregory Gaye as Count Frederic Brekenski
- Montagu Love as M. Courtois
- Renie Riano as Madame Courtois
- Fritz Feld as Martelleau
- Doris Lloyd as Madame Chauffourier-Dubleff
- Curt Bois as Alfonso
- Jerry Tucker as Urchin (uncredited)

== Sources ==
- The original play by Jacques Deval opened in Paris on 13 October 1933. Robert E. Sherwood's English adaptation opened in London on 24 April 1935 (Melville Cooper reprised his stage role for the movie), and on Broadway on Oct 15, 1936, starring Marta Abba.
- The play was made into the Broadway musical Tovarich (1963) (book by David Shaw, music by Lee Pockriss and lyrics by Anne Croswell) starring Vivien Leigh and Jean-Pierre Aumont. It ran for 264 performances and won Leigh the Tony Award for Best Actress.
