= Morris Carnovsky =

American actor (1897–1992)

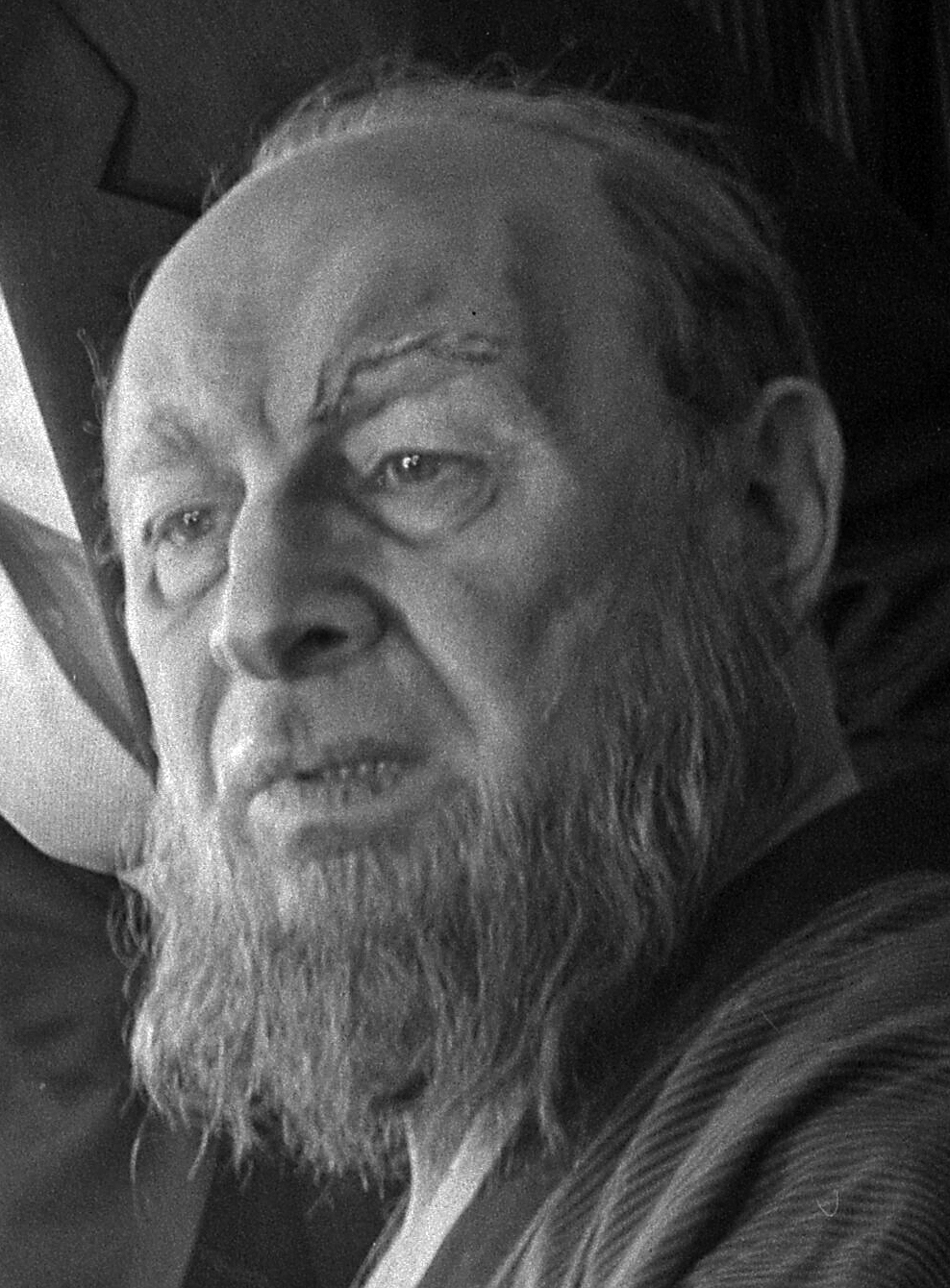
- Carnovsky as King Lear in 1964
- Born: September 5, 1897; St. Louis, Missouri, U.S.
- Died: September 1, 1992 (aged 94); Easton, Connecticut, U.S.
- Education: Washington University in St. Louis
- Occupation: Actor
- Years active: 1921–1984
- Spouses: Florence Lasersohn (m. 1922; div. 1933) Phoebe Brand (m. 1941)
- Children: 1
- Relatives: Leon Carnovsky (brother)

Morris Carnovsky (September 5, 1897 – September 1, 1992) was an American stage and film actor. He was one of the founders of the Group Theatre (1931-1940) in New York City and had a thriving acting career both on Broadway and in films until, in the early 1950s, professional colleagues told the House Un-American Activities Committee that Carnovsky had been a Communist Party member. He was blacklisted and worked less frequently for a few years, but then re-established his acting career, taking on many Shakespearean roles at the Stratford Shakespeare Festival and performing the title roles in college campus productions of King Lear and The Merchant of Venice. Carnovsky's nephew is veteran character actor and longtime "Pathmark Guy" James Karen.

== Early life ==
Carnovsky was born in St. Louis, Missouri, on September 5, 1897, to Ike (born Karnovsky) and Jennie Stillman, both Jewish immigrants from the Russian Empire. The librarian Leon Carnovsky (1903–1975) was his younger brother. His father, a grocer from Lithuania, took him to performances of the Yiddish theater. In 1975, he recalled: "There was such richness in their portrayals of Jewish life. I could savor it. Once I smelled greasepaint, I was committed." He attended Washington University in St. Louis, where he was a prominent member of the Thyrsus Dramatic Society, one of the first student-run theatre groups west of the Mississippi. He graduated in 1920 and then moved to Boston where he acted in his first professional stage production.

== Acting career ==
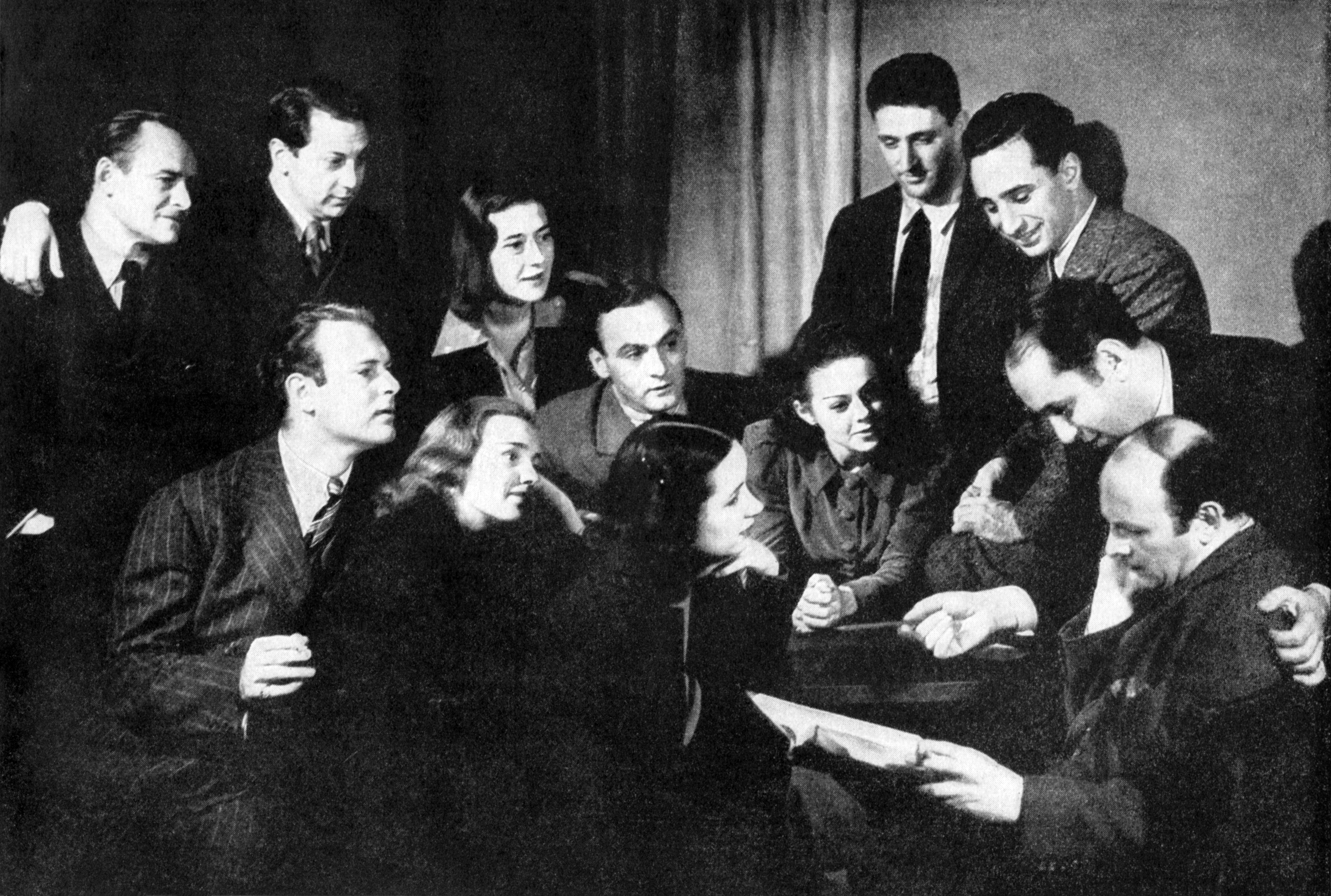
Morris Carnovsky (right) with Phoebe Brand (front row, center) and other members of the Group Theatre in 1938

In 1922, Carnovsky began his long career on Broadway with his New York stage debut as Reb Aaron in The God of Vengeance. Two years later, Carnovsky joined the Theatre Guild acting company and appeared in the title role of Uncle Vanya (by Anton Chekhov). This was followed by roles in Saint Joan (by George Bernard Shaw), The Brothers Karamazov, The Doctor's Dilemma (also by Shaw) and the role of Kublai Khan in Eugene O'Neill's Marco Millions.

In 1931, he helped found the Group Theatre, which specialized in dramas with socially relevant and politically tinged messages. He later explained: "We founded the Group because we were sick and tired of the old romantic theater and the encrusted star system. We weren't interested in stars. We were looking for real, living drama." Many of the Group's members were inspired by the Moscow Art Theatre and several members, including Carnovsky and his wife Phoebe Brand also joined the American Communist Party. Carnovsky summered at Pine Brook Country Club in Nichols, Connecticut, with the Group Theatre in 1936, as he worked with the Group during all their summer rehearsal periods, most of which were spent in the Catskills and upstate New York.

Carnovsky appeared in almost every major Group Theatre production, often playing parts that had been written specifically for him by his good friend, the actor and playwright Clifford Odets. Among Carnovsky's major triumphs at the Group Theatre were the Odets plays Awake and Sing, Golden Boy, Paradise Lost and Rocket to the Moon.

He also appeared in the anti-war musical Johnny Johnson, Sidney Kingsley's Men in White, the Elia Kazan-directed Thunder Rock, My Sister Eileen, and Cafe Crown. Writing about the Group's production of Awake and Sing!, the New York Times critic Brooks Atkinson said, "...Morris Carnovsky as the lonely old sage struggling with ideas he cannot resolve or use, gives a performance worth a mayor's reception on the steps of City Hall. Probably Mr. Carnovsky and Mr. Adler would have become remarkable actors in any case. But the discipline of the Group Theatre has given them a mastery of acting they could never have achieved by themselves. The Group Theatre makes good!"

In 1937 Carnovsky, along with several other actors from the Group, went to Hollywood in hopes of raising money to bolster the Group's shaky finances by working in films. Carnovsky's movie debut came in the Academy Award-winning best picture of 1937, William Dieterle's The Life of Emile Zola starring Paul Muni. It was followed by a supporting role in Anatole Litvak's Tovarich, before Carnovsky returned to New York and a newly re-configured formation of the Group Theatre. After the collapse of the Group Theatre in 1940, Carnovsky returned to Hollywood where he appeared in several more films. In 1939, he provided the narration for a film called The City that was screened at the 1939 New York World's Fair. He continued his stage work by joining the Actors' Lab, an acting troupe much like the Group, serving as its first director.

In 1943, he played a retired Norwegian school teacher, Sixtus Andresen, in the Warner Bros. anti-Nazi film, Edge of Darkness, which starred Errol Flynn and was directed by Lewis Milestone. Carnovsky portrayed George Gershwin's father in Rhapsody in Blue in 1945, and in Dead Reckoning (1947), he starred as the villainous nightclub owner Martinelli with Humphrey Bogart. In 1950, he portrayed LeBret in Cyrano de Bergerac starring José Ferrer. Later that year, he played Dr. Raymond Hartley in the mystery The Second Woman and the kindly judge who sentences a young boy who likes to play with firearms in Joseph H. Lewis's Gun Crazy. This was to be Carnovsky's last Hollywood film for 12 years.

On Broadway, Carnovsky appeared alongside Fredric March in Ibsen's An Enemy of the People, adapted by Arthur Miller, in the 1950-51 season. Atkinson wrote: "The impact of Mr. March's acting is dramatically balanced by the rich, forceful and accomplished acting of Morris Carnovsky as the cynical mayor of the town."

== Hollywood blacklist ==
Carnovsky was at one time a member of the American Communist Party. In April 1951, when questioned by the House Un-American Activities Committee (HUAC), he refused to answer any questions, citing his rights under the U.S. Constitution. At the same hearing, actor Marc Lawrence testified that he and Carnovsky had attended some of the same Communist Party functions. Carnovsky issued a statement after the hearing which said the committee's work was not really an inquiry, but "an inquisition into the inviolable areas of one's deepest manhood and integrity–the end result is the blacklist, the deprivation by innuendo of one's right to life, liberty and the pursuit of happiness in work."

He and his wife Phoebe Brand were identified as Communists by Elia Kazan, a Communist Party member himself at one time, in testimony before the HUAC in 1952, along with six other members of the Group Theatre. Actor Sterling Hayden testified before HUAC that he had attended Communist Party meetings that were sometimes held at Carnovsky's house in Hollywood. When Carnovsky was called before the HUAC he refused to "name names", which ended his film career. In 1975, he assessed the experience:

As an experience, it was revolting, injurious, hurtful. But from the point of view of the entire picture, in an odd way it nurtured me, strengthened me, made me hard, objective, even resigned. And to that degree I think it fed me as an actor.

In 1953, he and his wife, who had also been blacklisted, appeared off-Broadway in The World of Sholem Aleichem as part of a cast of blacklisted actors that were assembled to demonstrate that the New York theater audience would not make them outcasts. It ran for two years.

While Hollywood's lack of interest in him after his dealings with HUAC were unspoken, in one incident he was publicly uninvited from appearing as scheduled in May 1953 at a Jewish Community Center in Queens because he "would not be acceptable to the community".

== Return to acting ==
In 1955 he returned to Broadway as Priam in Jean Giradoux' Tiger at the Gates.

Then in 1956, Carnovsky recalled, "Shakespeare suddenly discovered me!" "In 1956", he said, "John Houseman, who was then the general director and producer at the American Shakespeare Theatre in Stratford, Connecticut, called me up and said, 'would you like to do some Shakespeare?' I said, 'Yes, of course!' So that's how I began. The first year I did a part in King John, a part in Measure for Measure and a part in The Taming of the Shrew. Then I proceeded to learn what Shakespeare was all about, in light of the realistic method of acting that I had discovered during my years with the Group Theatre. The following year, I found myself doing Shylock in The Merchant of Venice, and that was really the opening of the can of peas, for me." At Stratford he played many roles, notably Feste in Twelfth Night in a production featuring Katharine Hepburn as Viola, and Prospero in a celebrated production of The Tempest directed by William Ball of the American Conservatory Theater.

Again on Broadway, Carnovsky appeared in 1957 in Noël Coward's Nude with Violin.

He also appeared in a few more pictures: In 1962, he went to Paris to appear in Sidney Lumet's A View from the Bridge, an adaptation of Arthur Miller's play of the same name. In May 1966, he appeared in the title role of Bertolt Brecht's "Galileo Galilei" at the Goodman Theater in Chicago. He played Creon in a TV play of Medea, and in 1974 appeared in The Gambler, playing James Caan's grandfather. Public TV's Hollywood Television Theater. He played Judge Hoffman in the 1975 PBS TV two‐and‐a‐half hour dramatization of "The Chicago Conspiracy Trial." Culled by Christopher Burstall and Stuart Hood from 23,000 pages of the original transcript, the program is a 1970 co‐production of the British Broadcasting Corporation and Bavarian Television. Mr. Burstall also served as producer and director.(NYT July 10-1975)

He was inducted into the American Theatre Hall of Fame in 1979.

In 1980, he served on the artistic advisory board of the Yiddish National Theatre, a nonprofit effort to promote awareness of an increasingly forgotten part of stage history.

In the 1980s, Carnovsky was an instructor of Shakespearean acting at the National Theater Institute, at the Eugene O'Neill Theater Center in Waterford, CT.

A highly acclaimed performance at Stratford Shakespeare Festival in King Lear led to something of a second career for Carnovsky as a mentor of young actors, as he traveled to universities all over the country, playing the leading roles of Lear, Falstaff, and Shylock in the Shakespeare classics with supporting casts made up of college students.

== Writing ==
In 1984, he wrote a book The Actor's Eye with friend and colleague Peter Sander that distilled his theory of acting.

== Death ==
Morris Carnovsky died at his home in Easton, Connecticut, on September 1, 1992, four days before his 95th birthday, from natural causes. His wife, Phoebe Brand, died on July 3, 2004, at the age of 96 from pneumonia. The couple had a son, Stephen Carnovsky.

== Filmography ==
Year	Title	Role	Notes
1937	The Life of Emile Zola	Anatole France	
1937	Tovarich	Chauffourier Dubieff	
1943	Edge of Darkness	Sixtus Andresen	
1944	Address Unknown	Max Eisenstein	
1944	The Master Race	Old Man Bartoc	
1945	Rhapsody in Blue	Morris Gershwin	
1945	Our Vines Have Tender Grapes	Bjorn Bjornson	
1945	Cornered	Manuel Santana	
1946	Miss Susie Slagle's	Dr. Fletcher	
1947	Dead Reckoning	Martinelli	
1947	Dishonored Lady	Dr. Richard Caleb	
1947	Joe Palooka in the Knockout	Howard Abbott	
1948	Saigon	Alex Maris	
1948	Man-Eater of Kumaon	Ganga Ram	
1949	Siren of Atlantis	Le Mesge	
1949	Thieves' Highway	Yanko Garcos	
1950	Gun Crazy	Judge Willoughby	
1950	Western Pacific Agent	Joe Wicken	
1950	The Second Woman	Dr. Hartley	
1950	Cyrano de Bergerac	Le Bret	
1962	A View from the Bridge	Mr. Alfieri	
1974	The Gambler	A.R. Lowenthal	
1983	Joe's Bed-Stuy Barbershop: We Cut Heads		
