= The Forbidden Christ =

1951 film

- Film poster
- Directed by: Curzio Malaparte
- Written by: Curzio Malaparte
- Produced by: Eugenio Fontana
- Starring: Raf Vallone
- Cinematography: Gábor Pogány
- Edited by: Giancarlo Cappelli
- Release date: 24 March 1951
- Running time: 99 minutes
- Country: Italy
- Language: Italian

The Forbidden Christ (Italian: Il Cristo proibito) is a 1951 Italian drama film directed by Curzio Malaparte.

== Plot ==
Bruno is a veteran of the Russian campaign who returned on foot to his Montepulciano. Unlike the other veterans, his happiness at returning home is clouded by the death of his brother, a partisan shot by the Germans because of the betrayal of a fellow villager. Determined to avenge his brother, he tries to get the name of the informer told, but the villagers, tired of the violence and the blood of the war, refused to reveal it. Mastro Antonio, a modest carpenter friend of Bruno, for fear that an innocent person might be killed, makes him believe that the man he is looking for is him. At that confession Bruno takes a file and throws it at his heart. Before dying, the carpenter admits that he lied and sacrificed himself in place of the culprit. Having found the real culprit, he offers himself to Bruno's machine gun shots, but the latter, mindful of his friend's words, does not have the strength to hit the culprit, since an innocent person has already paid for him.

== Cast ==
- Raf Vallone as Bruno Baldi
- Rina Morelli as Mother Baldi
- Alain Cuny as Mastro Antonio
- Anna Maria Ferrero as Maria
- Elena Varzi as Nella
- Gino Cervi as The Sexton
- Ernesta Rosmino as Assunta
- Philippe Lemaire as Pinin
- Luigi Tosi as Andrea
- Gualtiero Tumiati as Bruno's Father

== Awards ==
Wins

- 1st Berlin International Film Festival – Special Prize for an Excellent Film Achievement

Nominations

- 1951 Cannes Film Festival – Palme d'Or
