= Human Torpedoes =

- Directed by: Antonio Leonviola; Carlo Lizzani (uncredited)
- Written by: Marc-Antonio Bragadin; Gian Giacomo Cossa
- Produced by: Carlo Ponti; Dino De Laurentiis
- Music by: Angelo Francesco Lavagnino
- Distributed by: Paramount Pictures
- Release date: December 29, 1954
- Running time: 87 minutes

Siluri umani (internationally released as Human Torpedoes) is a 1954 Italian war film credited to Antonio Leonviola, who abandoned production and was substituted by director Carlo Lizzani (uncredited). The movie depicts the successful WWII 1941 raid on Souda Bay in Crete by Italian Navy frogmen on the Royal Navy's HMS York heavy cruiser and a Norwegian oil tanker.

One of the military advisors to the film was former admiral Marcantonio Bragadin.

== Plot ==
Italy, probably at the end of 1940. Several officers and non-commissioned officers of the Italian Navy meet at a naval base at the invitation of the Italian Navy. Here they are told that a special operation against the Royal Navy is planned in Crete, which will require highly qualified personnel. All volunteer.

In a specially prepared training area, the volunteers train in the use of small torpedo boats and speed boats of the explosive boat type M.T. against the British. The boats carry only one torpedo. The tactic is to sneak up on the enemy ships at night and then head towards the target at top speed. Shortly before the collision, the speedboat drivers, who are wearing diving suits, are supposed to jump backwards off the boats. It is expected that the British will then rescue those who voluntarily shipwrecked. As the training officer points out, this is not a kamikaze operation.

The unit is transferred to the Greek island of Leros. But before the mission against Crete takes place, an emergency occurs. An Italian submarine is attacked and sunk by two British fighter-bombers. However, since the wreck lies in shallow waters, there is an opportunity to rescue part of the crew, who are in an area of the boat separated by bulkheads. In a highly dramatic rescue operation, the members of the commando succeed in first laying an oxygen line in the submarine and then opening a hatch so that the crew, who are extremely nervous, can finally get out of the sunken wreck and be rescued.

The command then attacks Souda Bay at night. With great difficulty it proves possible to overcome sea-mine barriers. Although they are spotted by the British guards and come under frenzied fire, the attack on the British units succeeds. The torpedo men who jumped off in time are rescued by the British and become prisoners of war.

== Cast ==
- Raf Vallone: Carlo Ferri
- Franco Fabrizi: Antonio
- Ettore Manni: Marco
- Andrea Checchi: Giorgio
- Elena Varzi: Anna
- Enrico Maria Salerno: Virgilio
- Nerio Bernardi: Capitano Mauri
- Emilio Cigoli: Admiral
- Christian Marquand: Paolo
- Carlo Pedersoli: Magrini
