= Forest of Love =

- Directed by: Alberto Bevilacqua
- Cinematography: Luigi Verga
- Edited by: Roberto Perpignani
- Music by: Carlo Rustichelli
- Release date: 1981
- Country: Italy
- Language: Italian

Bosco d'amore (internationally released as Forest of Love) is a 1981 Italian drama film directed by Alberto Bevilacqua. It is loosely based on story three from day five in The Decameron by Giovanni Boccaccio.

It entered the competition at the 38th Venice International Film Festival.

== Cast ==
- Monica Guerritore: Agnolella
- Rodolfo Bigotti: Pietro
- William Berger
- Mario Feliciani
- Orso Maria Guerrini
- Gisela Hahn
- Stanko Molnar
- Rina Franchetti
