= The Eyes Leave a Trace =

- Emma Penella and Raf Vallone in a screenshot from film
- Directed by: José Luis Sáenz de Heredia
- Written by: Carlos Blanco Hernández|Carlos Blanco
- Starring: Raf Vallone; Elena Varzi; Emma Penella
- Cinematography: Manuel Berenger
- Edited by: Julio Peña
- Music by: Manuel Parada
- Production company: Chapalo Films
- Distributed by: CIFESA
- Release date: 12 September 1952
- Running time: 96 minutes
- Countries: Italy; Spain
- Language: Spanish

The Eyes Leave a Trace (Spanish: Los ojos dejan huellas) is a 1952 Spanish-Italian thriller film directed by José Luis Sáenz de Heredia. It stars Italian actor Raf Vallone and his wife Elena Varzi. It was co-produced in Italy, where it is known as Uomini senza pace ("Men without peace").

It was shot at the Cinecittà Studios in Rome and on location in Madrid. The film's sets were designed by the art director Ramiro Gómez.

== Synopsis ==
Martin, a former lawyer dismissed from the bar and converted into a perfume salesman, works with Roberto, a brilliant classmate. He falls in love with his partner's wife. One night, Roberto asks Martin for help, because he thinks he killed his wife's lover.

== Cast ==
- Raf Vallone as Martín Jordán
- Elena Varzi as Berta
- Julio Peña as Roberto Ayala
- Fernando Fernán Gómez as Agente Díaz
- Emma Penella as Lola
- Félix Dafauce as Comisario Ozalla
- Gaspar Campos as Conserje
- Aníbal Vela as Comisario principal
- Fernando Sancho as Comensal irascible
- Carlos Díaz de Mendoza as Prestamista
- Antonio Riquelme as Sereno
- Beni Deus as Encargado del Café Gijón
- Julia Pachelo as Bibliotecaria
- Juana Mansó as Encargada del teléfono
- Francisco Bernal as Guía de El Escorial

== Bibliography ==
- Mira, Alberto. Historical Dictionary of Spanish Cinema. Scarecrow Press, 2010.
