= Raf Vallone =

Italian actor and footballer (1916–2002)

Raf Vallone Cavaliere di gran croce dell'OMRI
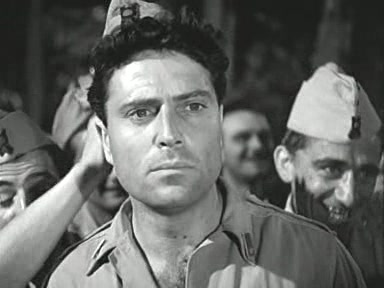
- Vallone in the movie Bitter Rice (1949)
- Born: Raffaele Vallone; 17 February 1916; Tropea, Calabria, Kingdom of Italy
- Died: 31 October 2002 (aged 86); Rome, Lazio, Italy
- Education: University of Turin
- Occupations: Actor; football player; journalist
- Years active: 1942–2000
- Spouse: Elena Varzi (m. 1952)
- Children: 3, including Eleonora (b. 1955)
- Awards: 1962 David di Donatello for Best Actor (A View from the Bridge)
- Honours: Knight's Grand Cross of the Italian Republic
Association football career
- Position: Midfielder
Youth career
- 1930-1934: Torino
Senior career*
Years	Team	Apps	(Gls)
1934-1939	Torino	23	(4)
1939-1940	Novara	7	(0)
1940-1941	Torino	2	(0)
Total		32	(4)
Medal record
Men's football
Coppa Italia
Winner	1935–36
- * Club domestic league appearances and goals

Raffaele "Raf" Vallone (17 February 1916 – 31 October 2002) was an Italian actor and footballer. One of the top male Italian stars of the 1950s and 1960s, he first became known for his association with the neorealist movement, and found success in several international productions. On stage, he was closely associated with the works of Arthur Miller. He played the role of Eddie Carbone in A View from the Bridge several times, including Sidney Lumet's 1962 film adaptation, for which he won the David di Donatello for Best Actor.

== Early life ==
Vallone was born in Tropea, Calabria, the son of a lawyer, and moved to Turin at an early age. He attended Liceo classico Cavour and studied law and philosophy at the University of Turin, where his professors included Leone Ginzburg and future President Luigi Einaudi. After graduation, he was employed at his father's law firm.

In 1941, Vallone became the culture editor for the culture section of L'Unità, then the official newspaper of the Italian Communist Party, and also a film and drama critic for the Turin newspaper La Stampa. An anti-fascist, he joined the Italian resistance organization Giustizia e Libertà in 1943, after the Badoglio Proclamation. He was arrested and incarcerated in Como, but escaped during a prisoner transfer, swimming across Lake Como in the process.

== Football ==
Vallone played association football from a young age, as a member of the Unione Libera Italiana del Calcio (ULIC) youth club for Turin, winning the championship for the 1930–31 season. He began playing professionally in 1934 while still a law student, entering Serie A for Torino as a midfielder. He won the Coppa Italia with his team in the 1935–36 season. He played for Novara in the 1939–40 season, and retired after 1941.

== Acting career ==
Vallone made his film debut in 1942 as an extra in We the Living, but he was not initially interested in an acting career. Nevertheless, he was cast as a soldier competing with Vittorio Gassman for the love of Silvana Mangano in Riso amaro (Bitter Rice; 1949). The film became a neorealist classic and Vallone was launched on an international career.

He played rugged, romantic leading men in the 1950s, including in Anna (1951) and The Beach (1954), both directed by Alberto Lattuada; Pietro Germi's The Crossroads (1951), and Giuseppe De Santis' Rome 11:00 (1952). He played Giuseppe Garibaldi, opposite Anna Magnani as Anita Garibaldi, in Francesco Rosi's directorial debut Red Shirts (1952). He was the male lead in Vittorio De Sica's Two Women, which earned its star Sophia Loren the Academy Award for Best Actress. His screen persona and acting style were often likened to those of Burt Lancaster. Curzio Malaparte, who directed him in The Forbidden Christ (1951), called Vallone "the only Marxist face in Italian cinema."

Vallone's work extended to other parts of Europe. He played opposite Maria Schell in two West German films, Love (1956) and Rose Bernd (1957), and was cast by French director Marcel Carné opposite Simone Signoret in Thérèse Raquin (1953). He played opposite Sara Montiel in The Violet Seller (1958), a musical that was the most internationally successful Spanish-language film released up to that point.

He made his American film debut opposite Charlton Heston in the historical epic El Cid (1961), as Count Ordóñez. He subsequently starred in Jules Dassin's Phaedra (1962), Otto Preminger's The Cardinal (1963) and Rosebud (1975), Gordon Douglas' Harlow (1965), Henry Hathaway's Nevada Smith (1966), Peter Collinson's The Italian Job (1969), John Huston's The Kremlin Letter (1970), Lamont Johnson's A Gunfight (1971), Charles Jarrott's The Other Side of Midnight (1977), J. Lee Thompson's The Greek Tycoon (1978), Michael Ritchie's An Almost Perfect Affair (1979) and Moustapha Akkad's Lion of the Desert (1980). He had a late-career boost when Francis Ford Coppola cast him as Cardinal Lamberto, the future Pope John Paul I, in The Godfather Part III (1990).

On stage, Vallone was known for his association with playwright Arthur Miller, notably as Eddie Carbone in A View from the Bridge. He first played the role in Peter Brook's acclaimed 1958 staging in Paris at the Théâtre Antoine-Simone Berriau. He reprised it for Sidney Lumet's 1962 film adaptation, which earned him the David di Donatello for Best Actor; a 1966 ITV Play of the Week, a 1967 Italian staging that he also directed, and a 1973 version for Italian television. In 1980, he directed a production for the Théâtre de Paris.

In 1994, he was made a Knight's Grand Cross of the Order of Merit of the Italian Republic for his contributions to the arts.

== Personal life ==
Vallone was married to actress Elena Varzi from 1952 until his death. They had three children, two of whom are actors, Eleonora Vallone (born 1955) and Saverio Vallone (born 1958). The family lived for many years at a villa constructed near Sperlonga. During the late 1950s, Vallone was romantically entangled with Brigitte Bardot.

Though an avowed communist sympathizer for much of his life, Vallone was never an enrolled member of the Italian Communist Party, due to his opposition to Stalinism.

In 2001, he published his autobiography, L'alfabeto della memoria, with Gremese (Rome).

== Death ==
Vallone died from a heart attack in Rome on 31 October 2002. His body was buried at his family chapel in the municipal cemetery of Tropea, his birthplace.

== Filmography ==
- We the Living (1942) as a sailor
- Bitter Rice (1949) as Marco
- No Peace Under the Olive Tree (1950) as Francesco Dominici
- The White Line (1950) as Domenico
- Path of Hope (1950) as Saro Cammarata
- The Crossroads (1951) as Aldo Marchi
- The Forbidden Christ (1951) as Bruno Baldi
- Anna (1951) as Andrea
- Rome 11:00 (1952) as Carlo
- The Adventures of Mandrin (1952) as Mandrin
- Red Shirts (1952) as Giuseppe Garibaldi
- The Eyes Leave a Trace (1952) as Martín Jordán
- Sunday Heroes (1952) as Gino Bardi
- Carne inquieta (1952) as Peppe Lamia
- Perdonami! (1953) as Marco Gerace
- Thérèse Raquin (1953) as Laurent
- Destini di donne (Destinées) (1954) as Callias (segment "Lysistrata")
- The Beach (1954) as Silvio, the Pontorno's Mayor
- Storm (1954) as Andrea
- Obsession (1954) as Aldo Giovanni
- Human Torpedoes (1954) as Commandant Carlo Ferri
- The Sign of Venus (1955) as Ignazio Bolognini
- Andrea Chénier (1955) as Gérard
- Il segreto di Suor Angela (Le Secret de soeur Angèle) (1956) as Marcello Maglione
- Passionate Summer (L'isola delle capre/Les Possédées, 1956) as Angelo
- Love (1956) as Andrea Ambaros
- Rose Bernd (1957) as Arthur Streckmann
- Guendalina (1957) as Guido Redaelli, padre di Guendalina
- The Violet Seller (1958) as Fernando
- La venganza (1958) as Luis 'El Torcido'
- La trappola si chiude (Le Piège) (1958) as Gino Carsone
- Recours en grâce (1960) as Mario Di Donati
- Two Women (1960) as Giovanni
- La Garçonnière (1960) as Alberto Fiorini
- El Cid (1961) as Count Ordóñez
- A View From the Bridge (1962) as Eddie Carbone
- Phaedra (1962) as Thanos
- The Cardinal (1963) as Cardinal Quarenghi
- The Secret Invasion (1964) as Roberto Rocca - Organizer
- La scoperta dell'America (1964)
- Una voglia da morire (1965) as Suo Marito
- Harlow (1965) as Marino Bello
- Nevada Smith (1966) as Father Zaccardi
- Se tutte le donne del mondo (1966) as Mr. Ardonian
- The Desperate Ones (1967) as Victor
- Volver a vivir (1967) as Luis Rubio
- 1001 Nights (1968)
- La Esclava del paraíso (1968) as Hixxum
- The Italian Job (1969) as Altabani
- The Kremlin Letter (1970) as Puppet Maker
- Death Occurred Last Night (1970) as Amanzio Berzaghi
- Cannon for Cordoba (1970) as Cordoba
- A Gunfight (1971) as Francisco Álvarez
- Perché non ci lasciate in pace? (1971)
- The Summertime Killer (1972) as Lazzaro Alfredi
- Un tipo con una faccia strana ti cerca per ucciderti (1973)
- Honor Thy Father (1973) (TV) as Joseph Bonanno
- Catholics (1973) as Father General
- Simona (1974) as L'oncle de Marcelle
- Small Miracle (1974) (TV) as Father Superior
- La Casa della paura (1974) as Mr. Dreese
- Rosebud (1975) as George Nikolaos
- That Lucky Touch (1975) as Gen. Peruzzi
- The Human Factor (1975) as Dr. Lupo
- Decadenza (1975)
- Marco Visconti (1975, TV series) as Marco Visconti
- The Other Side of Midnight (1977) as Constantin Demeris
- The Devil's Advocate (1978) as Bishop Aurelio
- The Greek Tycoon (1978) as Spyros Tomasis
- An Almost Perfect Affair (1979) as Federico 'Freddie' Barone
- Retour à Marseille (1980) as Michel - un émigré de retour à Marseille
- Lion of the Desert (1980) as Colonel Diodiece
- Sezona mira u Parizu (1981)
- I Remember Nelson (1982, TV series) - Caracciolo
- A Time to Die (1982) as Genco Bari
- The Scarlet and the Black (1983, TV Movie) as Father Vittorio
- Christopher Columbus (1985, TV Mini-Series) as José Vizinho
- Power of Evil (1985) as Laboratory director
- Der Bierkönig (1990, TV Movie) as Der Baron
- The Godfather Part III (1990) as Cardinal Lamberto
- A Season of Giants (1990, TV Movie) as Spanish Ambassador
- Julianus barát I (1991) as Archbishop Ugrin
- Julianus barát II (1991) as Archbishop Ugrin
- Julianus barát III (1991) as Archbishop Ugrin
- The First Circle (1991, TV Movie) as Pyotr Makaraguine
- Mit dem Herzen einer Mutter (1992, TV Movie) as Federico De' Conti
- Toni (1999) as Le vieux / The Old Man
- Vino santo (2000, TV Movie) as Nonno (final film role)
