= Pinewood Lake =

Lake in Connecticut, United States

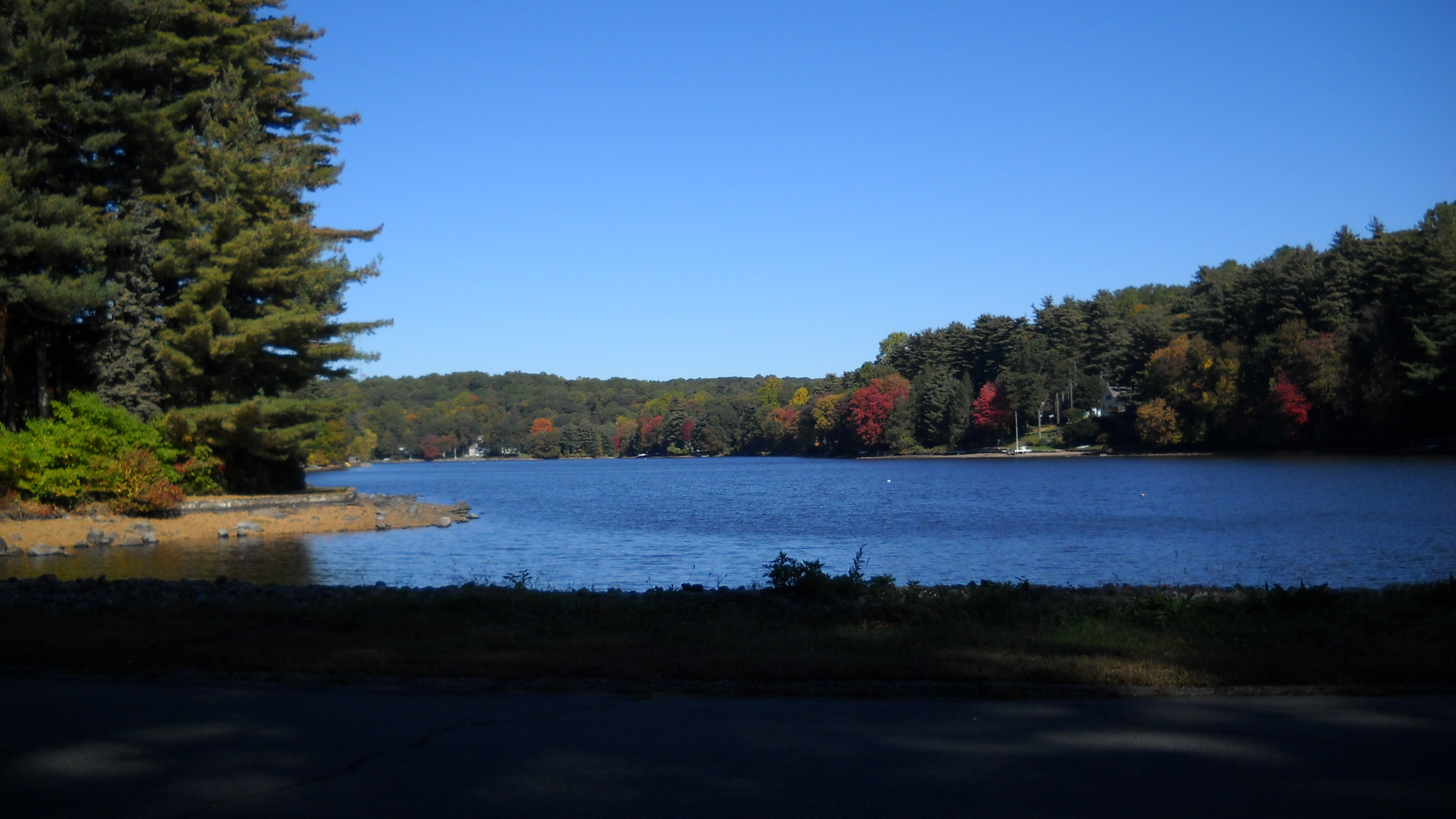
- Pinewood Lake

- Location within Connecticut
- Location: Fairfield County, Connecticut
- Coordinates: 41.256°N 73.176°W
- Type: lake

Pinewood Lake is a natural lake located northwest of the 330-foot-tall (100 m) Mischa Hill in the Nichols Farms Historic District section of Trumbull, Connecticut.

== Pinewood Lake Association ==
Pinewood Lake and its facilities are the center of a private recreational community with no public access. In addition to the lake, Pinewood Lake Association maintains a clubhouse, several boat racks, two dams, a common access beach and several access parcels interspersed between houses that border the lake.

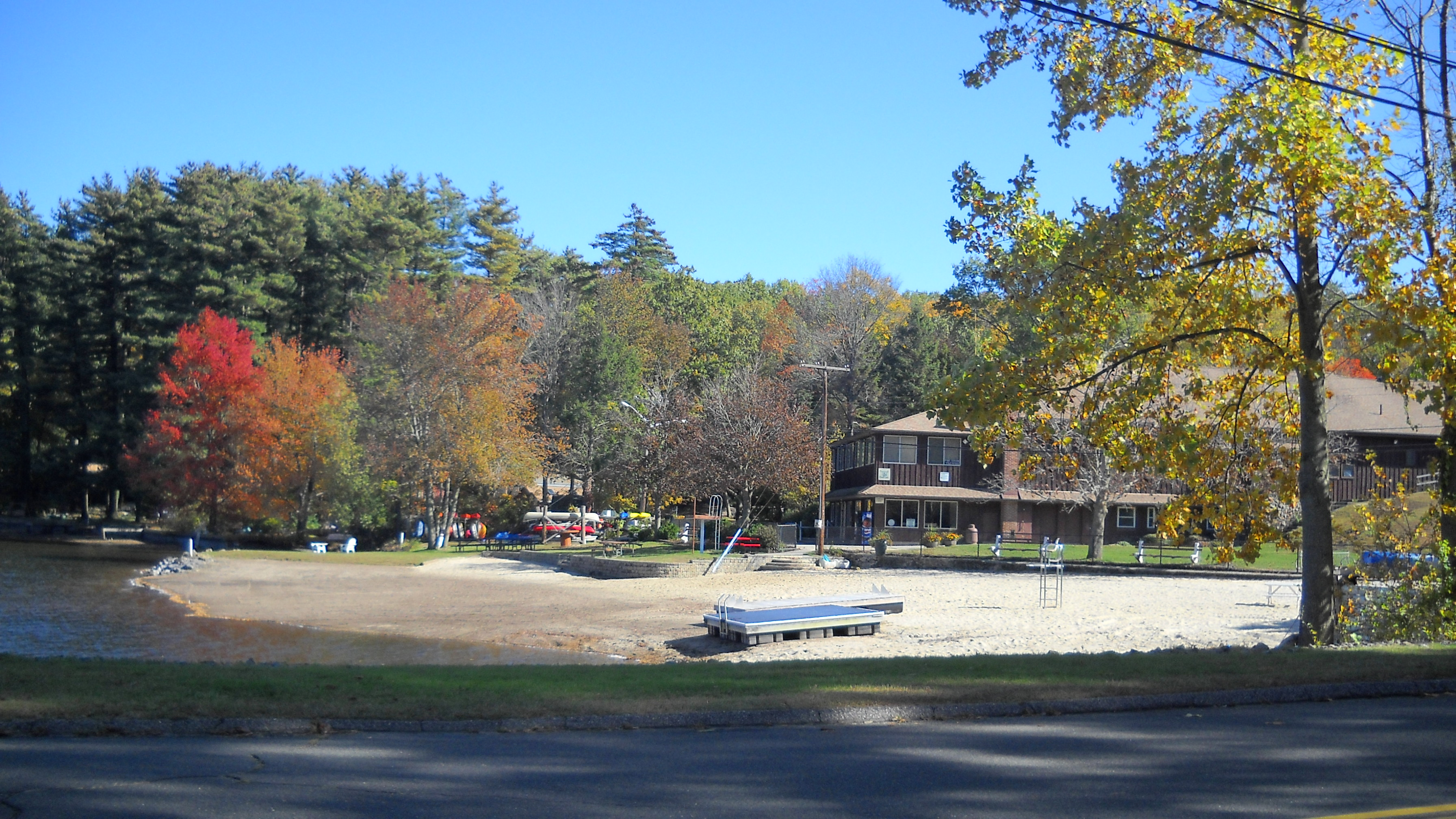
Pinewood Lake Association Clubhouse

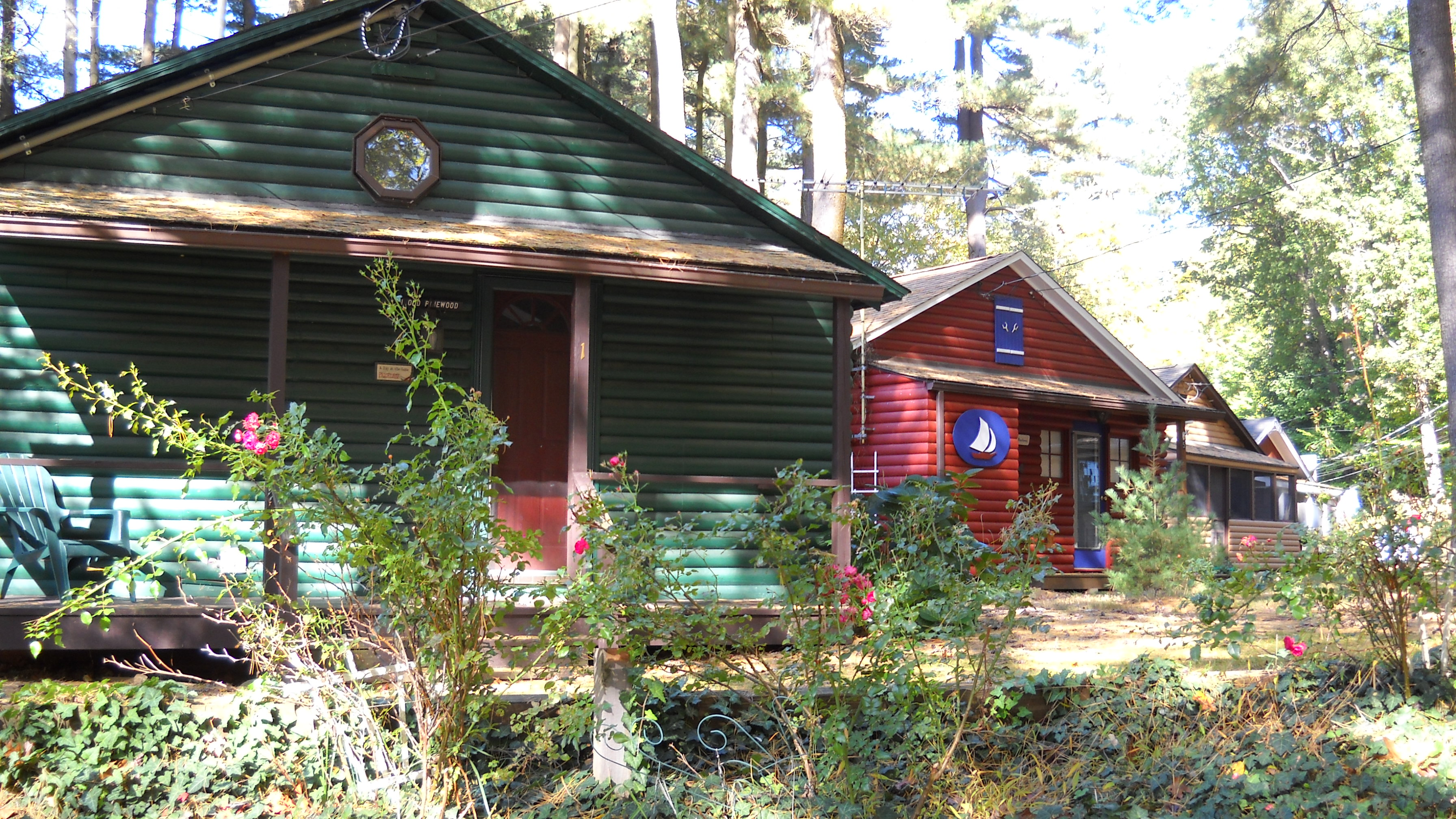
Original Pine Brook Country Club cabins ca. 1931

== History ==
The Pinewood Lake area was the home of Mischa, a member of the Golden Hill Paugussett Indian Nation. The natural lake was later called Old Farm Pond by the English who settled the area in the 17th century. Old Farm Pond was about 1150 feet long and 775 feet at its widest part, tapering to points at both ends. This pond was fed by Booth Hill Brook and Bears Den Brook, which joined about 1550 feet above the pond.

== Pine Brook Country Club ==
Benjamin Plotkin purchased Pinewood Lake and the surrounding acreage and built an auditorium with a revolving stage, forty cabins and incorporated as the Pine Brook Country Club in 1930. Plotkin's dream was to market the club as a summer resort for people to stay and enjoy theatrical productions. Pine Brook is best known for becoming the summer home of the most important experiment in the history of American theatre. The Group Theatre (New York) was formed in New York City by Harold Clurman, Cheryl Crawford and Lee Strasberg. The group was made up of actors, directors, playwrights and producers and gathered at Pine Brook during the summer of 1936. The group produced works by the most important American playwrights of the time on real life subject matter which changed stage and film forever. Some of the artists who summered at Pine Brook Lake were Elia Kazan, Harry Morgan, John Garfield, Frances Farmer, Will Geer, Howard Da Silva, Clifford Odets, Lee J. Cobb and Irwin Shaw. In 1944, Pine Brook Country Club was sold, reorganized and chartered as the Pinewood Lake Association.

== Environment ==
Pinewood Lake is fed by three streams that bring sediment, chemical pollutants such as phosphorus and nitrates from fertilizer, and biological pollutants such as E. coli from humans. The lake is dredged periodically to reduce silt and to slow the natural tendency of the lake to fill in and become a meadow. The waters are home to endemic species of snails, leeches and insects. Hardy fish such as sunnies and perch survive year-round. Other fish such as trout and bass are stocked each spring. Intrusive organisms are a constant concern. Over the years the lake has seen waves algae and of water weeds like Valisineria. Changes in climate, runoff chemicals, silt levels and other large scale environmental factors and non-migratory Geese make it a dynamic challenge to keep the lake clear for swimming and boating. The lake is largely able to dilute, buffer and cleanse itself, and through careful practices designed and implemented by the Lake Water Quality Committee, the water is safe for enjoyment. As of 2006, there have been no appearances of zebra mussels.

== Governance ==
Pinewood Lake Association is registered as an operating company in the State of Connecticut. Business activities are managed by a board of governors consisting of owner members elected from the various properties that are eligible for owner membership status within the association.
