= Lady Caliph =

1970 film

- Directed by: Alberto Bevilacqua
- Written by: Alberto Bevilacqua
- Produced by: Mario Cecchi Gori
- Starring: Ugo Tognazzi; Romy Schneider
- Cinematography: Roberto Gerardi
- Edited by: Sergio Montanari
- Music by: Ennio Morricone
- Release date: 1970
- Running time: 112 minutes
- Countries: Italy; France
- Language: Italian

Lady Caliph (Italian: La califfa) is a 1970 Italian-French drama film written and directed by Alberto Bevilacqua. It was entered into the 1971 Cannes Film Festival.

== Plot ==
In the Emilia province of Italy, out of solidarity with the workers fired from another failed company, the workers occupy the factory of self-made industrialist Annibale Doberdò (played by Ugo Tognazzi). In dealing with the situation, he starts negotiations. An employee, the beautiful and fiery Irene, nicknamed Califfa (Romy Schneider), whose worker-husband was killed during a demonstration, meets with Doberdò. He wants to induce the strikers back to work and they show uncertainty between the directives of their union and the incitements to violence by extremists. Irene becomes Doberdò's lover and asks the workers to listen to the industrialist's proposals for renewal of working terms and worker participation in the factory management. The riots, however, continue. The industrialist's stance is badly received by other employers. While he returns from yet another meeting with his lover, Doberdò is killed by assassins.

== Cast ==
- Ugo Tognazzi - Annibale Doberdò, industrialist
- Romy Schneider - Irene "La Califfa" Corsini, worker
- Massimo Farinelli - Giampiero Doberdò, son of Annibale
- Marina Berti - Clementine Doberdò, wife of Annibale
- Guido Alberti - Catholic priest
- Roberto Bisacco - Bisacco
- Gigi Ballista - major industrialist
- Massimo Serato - failed industrialist
- Eva Brun - wife of failed industrialist
- Luigi Casellato - police commissioner
- Gigi Reder - servant
- Ernesto Colli - worker
- Enzo Fiermonte - union activist

== Music ==
The film's music was composed by Ennio Morricone. Parts of the score have been used in the competitive programs of figure skaters, including Elena Berezhnaya and Anton Sikharulidze at the 2002 Winter Olympics and Johnny Weir at the 2010 Winter Olympics.
