= A View from the Bridge (film) =

1962 film by Sidney Lumet

- Directed by: Sidney Lumet
- Screenplay by: Norman Rosten; Jean Aurenche
- Based on: A View from the Bridge by Arthur Miller
- Produced by: Paul Graetz
- Starring: Raf Vallone; Maureen Stapleton; Jean Sorel; Carol Lawrence; Raymond Pellegrin; Morris Carnovsky
- Cinematography: Michel Kelber
- Edited by: Françoise Javet
- Music by: Maurice Leroux
- Production companies: Transcontinental Films; Produzioni Intercontinentali
- Distributed by: Cocinor (France); Euro International (Italy)
- Release dates: 18 January 1962 (Italy); 19 January 1962 (France); 22 January 1962 (U.S.)
- Running time: 118 minutes
- Countries: France; Italy

A View from the Bridge (French: Vu du pont, Italian: Uno sguardo dal ponte) is a 1962 drama film directed by Sidney Lumet, based on the Arthur Miller play of the same name. The film was an international co-production between French and Italian studios, with exteriors shot on-location in Brooklyn and interiors filmed in Paris, France. It was written for the screen by Norman Rosten and Jean Aurenche, and stars Raf Vallone as Eddie Carbone, Maureen Stapleton as Beatrice, Carol Lawrence as Catherine, Jean Sorel as Rodolpho, Raymond Pellegrin as Marco, and Morris Carnovsky as Alfieri.

== Plot ==
The Carbones are a working class Italian-American family living in the Red Hook neighborhood of Brooklyn - patriarch Eddie, his wife Beatrice, and their niece Catherine. Eddie is a longshoreman on the waterfront, and he and Beatrice have raised 18-year old Catherine from infancy.

When two of Beatrice's cousins from Sicily, Marco and Rodolpho, illegally enter the United States and take refuge in Eddie's home, an attraction develops between Catherine and the handsome young Rodolpho. Eddie's incestuous love for his niece drives him into cruel criticism of Rodolpho, including the accusation that he is an opportunist who plans to marry Catherine only to obtain his U.S. citizenship papers.

When Eddie's efforts fail to influence Catherine, he brands Rodolpho a homosexual and degrades him in front of Catherine by kissing him on the lips. His desperation only serves to further alienate Catherine, however, and when she and Rodolpho make plans to marry, Eddie betrays both Marco and Rodolpho to the immigration authorities. As the two brothers are led away, Marco spits on Eddie, denouncing him as an informer.

A waterfront lawyer, Alfieri, succeeds in winning freedom for Rodolpho because of his pending marriage, but Marco is slated for deportation. While out on bail, Marco goes to the Carbone house and forces Eddie to his knees; humiliated before his family and neighbors, Eddie commits suicide by plunging a cargo hook into his chest.

== Cast ==
- Raf Vallone as Eddie Carbone
- Maureen Stapleton as Beatrice Carbone
- Jean Sorel as Rodolpho
- Carol Lawrence as Catherine
- Raymond Pellegrin as Marco
- Morris Carnovsky as Alfieri
- Harvey Lembeck as Mike
- Mickey Knox as Louis
- Vincent Gardenia as Lipari
- Frank Campanella as Sam

== Production ==
A View from the Bridge was filmed in separate English and French versions. Its exterior sequences were filmed on-location on the waterfront of Brooklyn, New York, where the play and the film take place. The interiors were shot at a studio in Paris, France. It was Sidney Lumet's first time directing a film outside the United States.

The film was the first time that a kiss between men was shown on screen in America, in the sequence in which an intoxicated Eddie Carbone kisses his wife Beatrice's male cousin Rodolfo in an attempt to demonstrate the latter's alleged homosexuality. However, this overture was intended as an accusation of someone being gay, rather than a romantic expression.

Unlike the play, in which Eddie is stabbed to death with his own knife in a scuffle with his wife Beatrice's cousin Marco toward the end, in the film Eddie commits suicide by plunging a cargo hook into his chest.

== Reception ==
A View from the Bridge premiered in the United States on 22 January 1962 by Continental Film Distributors, to generally negative reviews. In Film Quarterly, Pauline Kael called the film "not so much a drama as a sentence that's been passed on the audience." Stanley Kauffmann's review for The New Republic was titled "The Unadaptable Adapted."

A more favorable review came from The New York Times film critic Bosley Crowther, who praised Sidney Lumet's realistic depiction of the Brooklyn waterfront and his choice of actors but believed that principal character Eddie Carbone lacked depth and dimension. "The rumbling and gritty quality of the Brooklyn waterfront," he wrote, "the lofty and mercantile authority of the freight ships tied up at the docks, the cluttered and crowded oppressiveness of the living rooms of the dockside slums are caught in his camera's comprehension, to pound it into the viewer's head that this is an honest presentation of the sort of personal involvement that one might watch—might spy upon—through a telescope set on Brooklyn Bridge." However, "The one great obstruction to the drama — and a fatal obstruction it becomes—is the slowly evolving demonstration that the principal character is a boor. As much as his nigh-incestuous passion and his subsequent jealousy may be credible and touching, they are low in the human emotional scale and are obviously seamy and ignoble. They haven't the universal scope of greed or envy or ambition or such obsessions as drive men to ruin."

On Rotten Tomatoes, the film has an approval rating of 80% based on reviews from 5 critics.

== Accolades ==
For his performance as Eddie Carbone, Raf Vallone won the David di Donatello for Best Actor.
