= Phoebe Brand =

American actress

- Born: November 27, 1907; Syracuse, New York, U.S.
- Died: July 3, 2004 (aged 96); New York City, U.S.
- Occupation: Actress
- Spouse: Morris Carnovsky (1941-1992; his death)
- Children: 1

Phoebe Brand (November 27, 1907 – July 3, 2004) was an American actress.

== Life ==
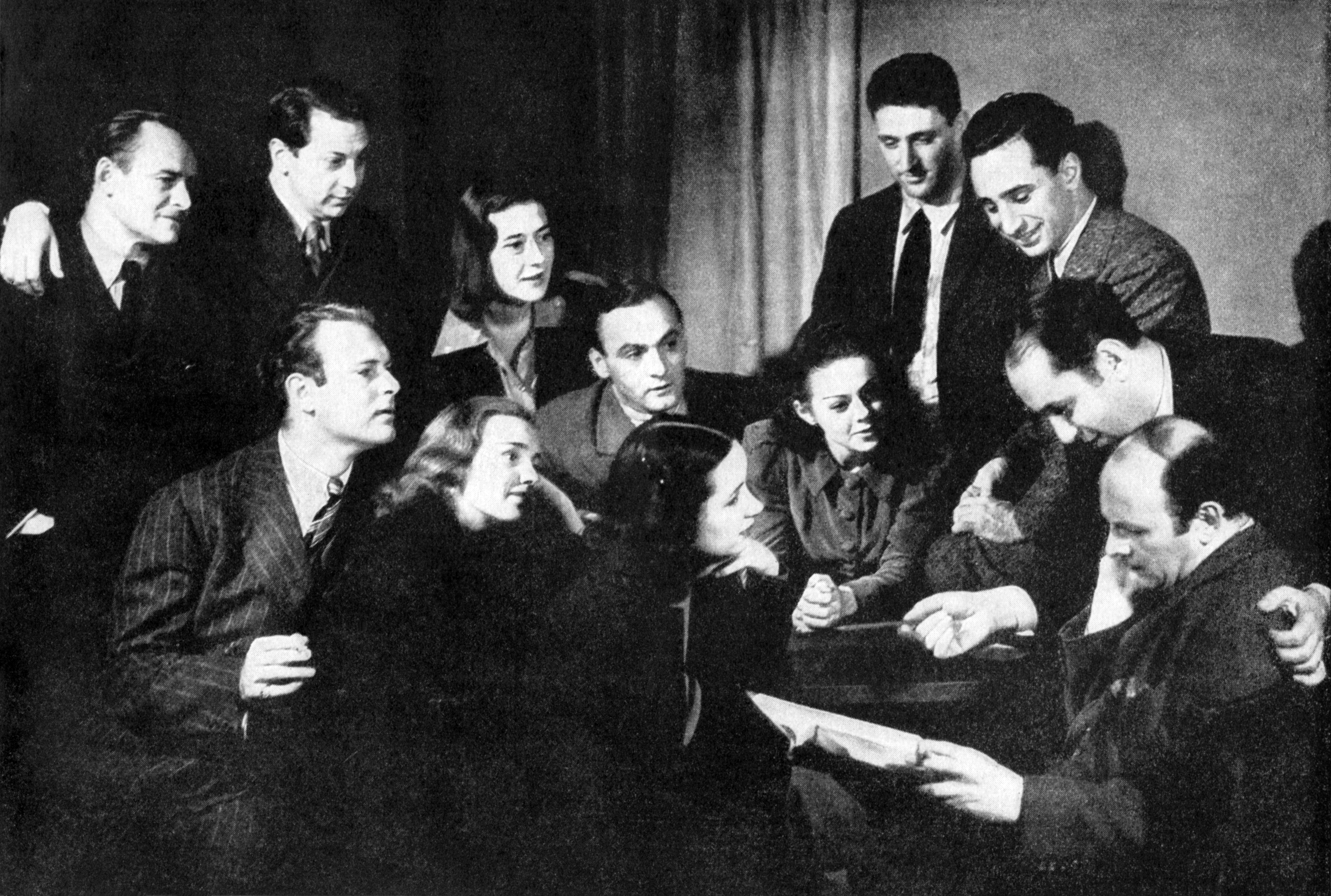
Phoebe Brand (front row, center) and Morris Carnovsky (right) with other members of the Group Theatre in 1938

Brand was born in Syracuse, New York in 1907 and raised in Ilion, Herkimer County, New York. Her father worked for Remington Typewriter Company as a mechanical engineer.

She moved to New York City and became an actress, appearing first in several revivals of Gilbert and Sullivan musicals beginning at age 18, and appeared in Winthrop Ames Gilbert and Sullivan Company's production of The Mikado in Columbus, Ohio in 1928.

In New York in 1931, Brand was one of the founders of the Group Theatre, described by The New York Times as "a radical company that dealt with social issues confronting the United States during the Depression." Her roles included Hennie Berger in Clifford Odets's Awake and Sing! in 1935 and the role of Anna in his Golden Boy in 1937.

She created the role of Minny Belle in Kurt Weill's Johnny Johnson in 1936. She summered at Pine Brook Country Club in Nichols, Connecticut, with the Group Theatre in 1936.

She married Morris Carnovsky, an actor and fellow member of the Group Theatre, moved to Hollywood in 1940. They married in 1941. They had one child, Stephen Carnovsky, and she raised a niece as well. She continued to use her maiden name professionally.

In 1952, during the McCarthy era's campaign against Communist influence in the entertainment industry, director Elia Kazan identified the couple as Communists when he testified before the House Un-American Activities Committee. (Note: They had been identified as Communists before the same committee the previous year by Leo Townsend, a screenwriter. Lee J. Cobb testified in 1953 that Brand and Carnovsky had recruited him into the Communist Party in 1940 or 1941.)

They were consequently blacklisted and generally unable to work in film and on stage. In 1953, they both appeared off-Broadway in The World of Sholem Aleichem as part of a cast of blacklisted actors that was assembled to demonstrate that the New York theater audience would not make them outcasts. It ran for two years. Decades later she recalled this period of her life as a "killingly frightening" time.

Instead she became an acting teacher and taught acting in New York until she died. Her husband returned to work on the stage in the late 1950s, and in the early 1960s she co-founded an acting troupe that presented classic plays in both English and Spanish in New York's poor neighborhoods, Theater in the Street. She served as the group's artistic director.

In 1969, her husband starred and she played a small role in Tyrone Guthrie's production of Lamp at Midnight on a U.S. tour.

In 1994, she appeared in Louis Malle's Vanya on 42nd Street, a film that documents a collaborative effort to stage Chekhov's play Uncle Vanya.

== Death ==
She died from pneumonia in New York City on July 3, 2004, at the age of 96.
