= Rome 11:00 =

1952 Italian film

- Directed by: Giuseppe De Santis
- Written by: Cesare Zavattini; Basilio Franchina; Giuseppe De Santis; Rodolfo Sonego; Gianni Puccini
- Produced by: Paul Graetz
- Starring: Carla Del Poggio; Lucia Bosé; Raf Vallone
- Cinematography: Otello Martelli
- Edited by: Gabriele Varriale
- Music by: Mario Nascimbene
- Release date: 28 February 1952
- Running time: 105 minutes
- Country: Italy
- Language: Italian

Rome 11:00 (Italian: Roma, ore 11), also known as Rome 11 o'clock, is a 1952 Italian neorealist film directed by Giuseppe De Santis. It is based on the real story of an accident that happened on 15 January 1951 on Via Savoia in Rome when a staircase collapsed because of the weight of two hundred women waiting for a job interview. One woman was killed and 76 were injured.

== Plot ==
In response to a newspaper ad seeking a secretary for an accountant's office, two hundred women gather on a small building's staircase, hoping for an interview. They come from diverse backgrounds: fallen nobles, prostitutes seeking to change their lives, wives with unemployed husbands, and affluent daughters with not enough pension to survive.

Waiting on the stairs, the women exchange impressions and discuss their lives of misery and their tricks for making a living. Gianna is first in line, the pawn of a strong-willed mother, while Caterina is a prostitute hoping for a new life. Angelina is a servant, also hoping to escape her situation. Other characters include a pregnant unwed mother, a young woman who wants to be a singer, and an artist's mistress.

When a poor workman's wife, Luciana Renzoni, tries to move ahead in the line, the resulting scuffle among the women causes the staircase to collapse.

The injured are taken to a hospital, but to be treated, the hospital is demanding a payment of 2,300 Lire per day. Many of them are unable to pay and are forced to go home.

== Cast ==
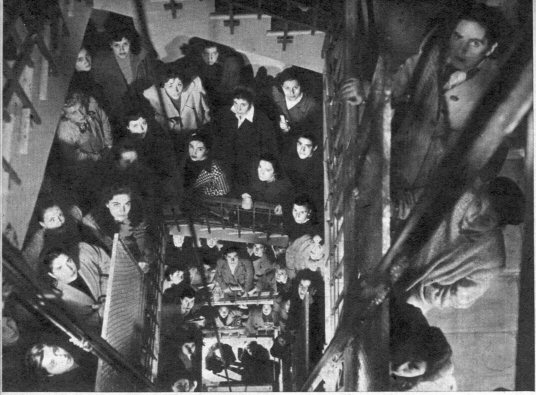
Still from Rome 11:00

- Lucia Bosé, Simona
- Carla Del Poggio, Luciana Renzoni
- Maria Grazia Francia, Cornelia Riva
- Lea Padovani, Caterina
- Delia Scala, Angelina
- Elena Varzi, Adriana
- Raf Vallone, Carlo
- Massimo Girotti, Nando
- Paolo Stoppa, father of Clara
- Armando Francioli, Romoletto
- Paola Borboni, Matilde
- Irène Galter, Clara
- Eva Vanicek, Gianna
- Checco Durante, father of Adriana
- Alberto Farnese, Augusto
- Hélène Vallier, typist
- Bianca Beltrami
- Cabiria Guadagnino
- Teresa Ellati
- Maria Pia Trepaoli
- Fulvia Trozzi
- Donatella Trombadori
- Nando Di Claudio
- Fausto Guerzoni
- Michele Riccardini
- Renato Mordenti
- Pietro Tordi
- Ezio Rossi
- Henry Vilbert
- Marco Vicario
- Mino Argentieri
- Anna Maria Zijno (real survivor at via Savoia)
- Maria Ammassari (real survivor at via Savoia)
- Renata Ciaffi (real survivor at via Savoia)

== Reception ==
New York Times film critic Bosley Crowther called Rome 11:00 a "vivid, raw-boned movie" and "a film of absorbing interest and persistent emotional power." He also praised Carla Del Poggio for her sensitive portrayal of the anguish felt by her character, Luciana Renzoni, after precipitating the tragedy.

== Awards ==
- Nastro d'Argento for Best Music (Mario Nascimbene)

== Legacy ==
In 1956, filmmaker Elio Petri published Roma ore 11, a collection of his interviews with people involved in the tragedy. The documentation originally served as a basis for the film. The work was republished in 2004.

== See also ==
- Tre storie proibite, a film by Augusto Genina based on the same incident
