= Gardenia (film) =

- Directed by: Domenico Paolella
- Screenplay by: Augusto Caminito
- Story by: Teodoro Corra; Gino Capone; Augusto Caminito
- Starring: Franco Califano; Martin Balsam; Robert Webber; Eleonora Vallone
- Cinematography: Sergio Robini
- Edited by: Amedeo Giomini
- Music by: Franco Califano
- Production companies: P.A.C.; Orsa Maggiore Cinematografica
- Distributed by: P.A.C.
- Release date: 5 May 1979 (Italy)
- Running time: 100 minutes
- Country: Italy
- Languages: Italian; English
- Box office: ₤108 million

Gardenia (Italian: Gardenia, il giustiziere della mala) is a 1979 Italian poliziottesco film directed by Domenico Paolella. It represents the first leading role for the singer-songwriter Franco Califano.

== Plot ==
In the city of Rome lives Gardenia, a respected exponent of Roman organized crime who shows a certain humanity in managing his business. He runs a restaurant and a clandestine gambling house, and has a woman named Regina.

Contacted by Don Salluzzo, a mafia boss, he categorically refuses to enter the drug business and sell it in his restaurant.

Because of his refusal, he comes into conflict with Salluzzo who tries several times to eliminate him, but with the help of some childhood friends he finally manages to win.

== Cast ==
- Franco Califano as Gardenia
- Martin Balsam as Salluzzo
- Robert Webber as Tony Caruso
- Eleonora Vallone as Regina
- Licinia Lentini as Miriam Bella
- Franco Diogene as Friend of Gardenia
- María Baxa as Gardenia Girl
- Venantino Venantini as Nocita
- Lory Del Santo as Laura
- Lorraine De Selle as Consuelo
- Melissa Chimenti as Melissa

== Release ==
Gardenia was released theatrically in Italy on 5 May 1979 where it was distributed by P.A.C. It grossed 108 million Italian lire on its release in Italy.

== See also ==
- List of Italian films of 1979
