= Pine Brook Country Club =

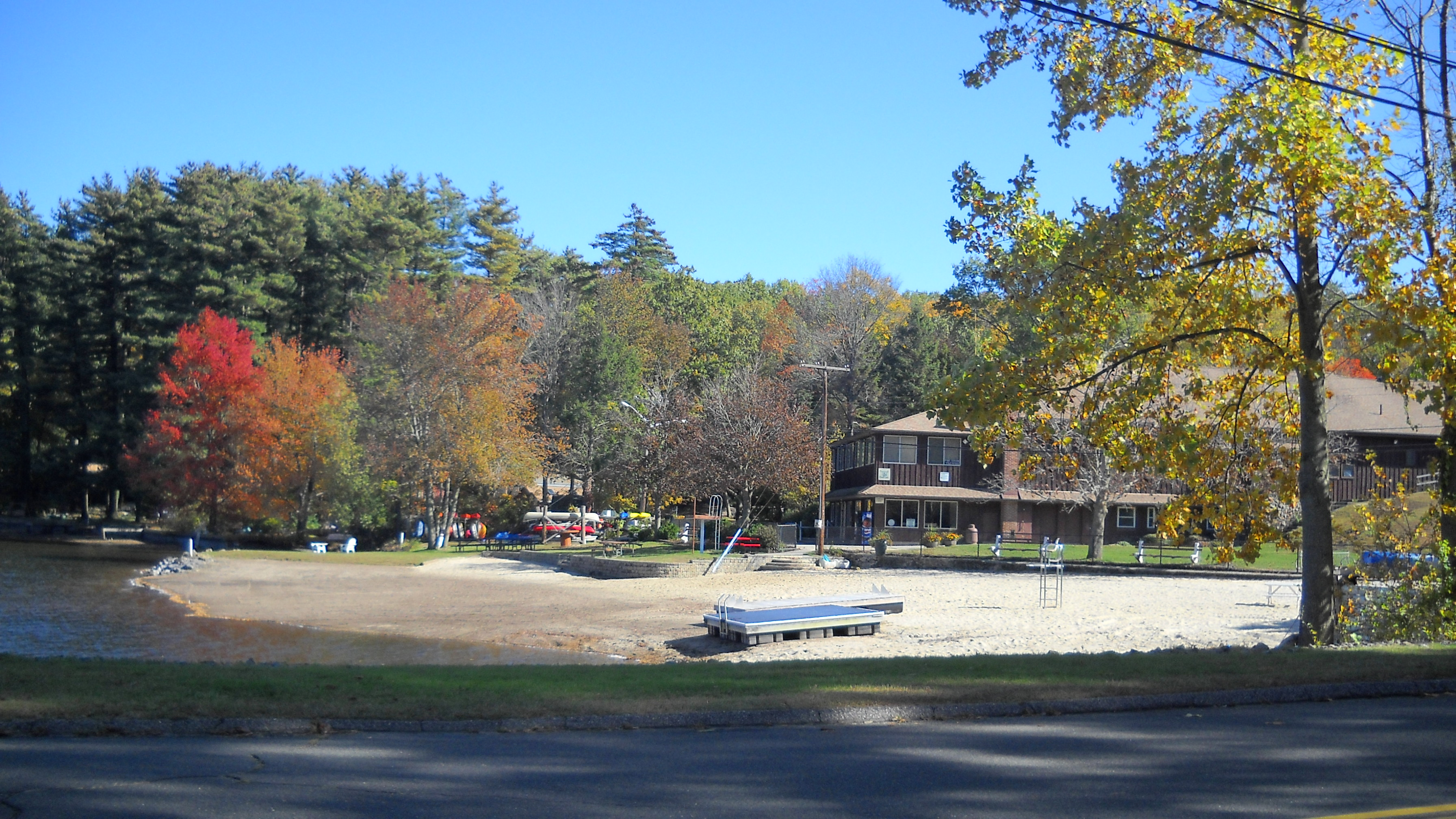
Pine Brook today

Pine Brook Country Club is a private lake association in Nichols, Connecticut, a village within the Town of Trumbull. It began when Benjamin Plotkin purchased Pinewood Lake and the surrounding countryside on Mischa Hill. Plotkin built an auditorium with a revolving stage and forty rustic cabins and incorporated as the Pine Brook Country Club in 1930. Plotkin's dream was to market the rural lakeside club as a summer resort for people to stay and enjoy theatrical productions. The Club remained in existence until productions were disrupted by World War II, and was reorganized as a private lake association in 1944.

== Group Theatre ==
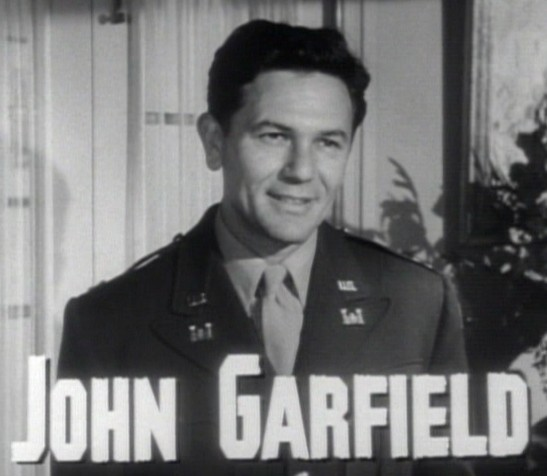
John Garfield from 1947's Gentleman's Agreement movie trailer

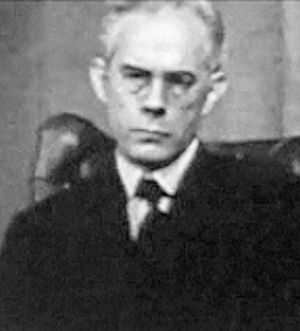
Harry Morgan from 1960's Inherit the Wind

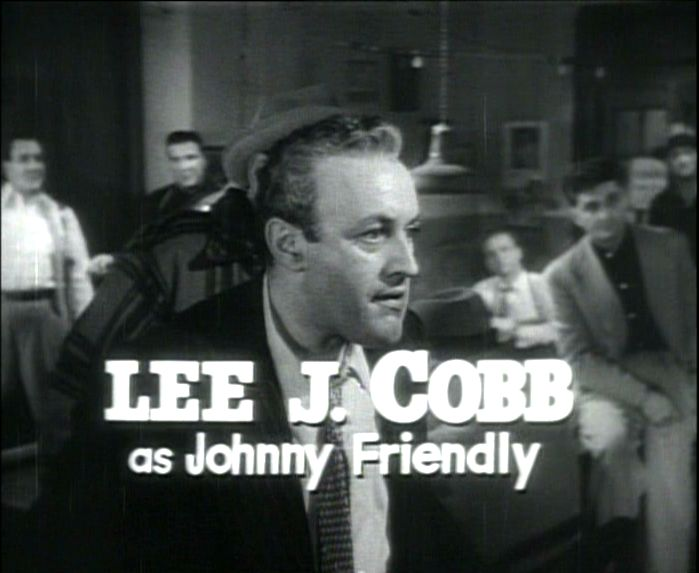
Lee J. Cobb from 1954's On the Waterfront movie trailer

Pine Brook is best known for having been the 1936 summer rehearsal headquarters for the Group Theater. It was formed in New York City in 1931 by Harold Clurman, Cheryl Crawford and Lee Strasberg and was made up of actors, directors, playwrights and producers. During this summer the artists "sang for their supper" while taking classes, attempting to reorganize their structure, and beginning rehearsals on Johnny Johnston, their next Broadway production.

During the summer of 1936, Paul Green, Cheryl Crawford, Kurt Weill and Weill's wife Lotte Lenya rented an old house at 277 Trumbull Avenue located two miles from Pine Brook in Bridgeport, Connecticut. It was here that Green and Weill wrote the play and music for the controversial Broadway play Johnny Johnson (musical), which was titled after the most frequently occurring name on the American casualty list of World War I. It was also during this time that Lotte Lenya had her first American love affair with Paul Green.

== Artists ==
Including and in addition to the Group Theatre, some of the artists who are known to have spent the summer at Pine Brook at one time or another were: Stella Adler, Leonard Bernstein, Marc Blitzstein, Roman Bohnen, Phoebe Brand, Morris Carnovsky, Carol Channing, Montgomery Clift, Lee J. Cobb, Imogene Coca, Betty Comden, Howard Da Silva, Frances Farmer, John Garfield, Betty Garrett, Michael Gordon (film director), Will Geer, Adolph Green, Paul Green (playwright), Judy Holliday, Lena Horne, Elia Kazan, Arthur Laurents, Canada Lee, Lotte Lenya, Robert Lewis (actor), Sanford Meisner, Harry Morgan, Clifford Odets, Luise Rainer, John Randolph (actor), Jerome Robbins, Irwin Shaw, Anna Sokolow, Ralph Steiner, Paul Strand, Franchot Tone, Nancy Walker and Kurt Weill.

== Sale ==
In 1944 Pine Brook went into receivership and was sold, reorganized and chartered as the Pinewood Lake Association, a private lake association.
