= Le rose di Danzica =

- Directed by: Alberto Bevilacqua
- Cinematography: Giuseppe Aquari
- Edited by: Raimondo Crociani
- Music by: Luis Enriquez Bacalov
- Release date: 1979
- Country: Italy
- Language: Italian

Le rose di Danzica (internationally released as The Roses of Danzig) is an Italian war-drama film directed by Alberto Bevilacqua. It premiered at the 27th San Sebastián International Film Festival. It was released theatrically in December 1979 and was later broadcast in a longer version in 1981 on Rai 2. It is based on Bevilaqua's own novel with the same name.

== Plot ==
Through the confrontation between two military leaders, Konrad von der Berg and Erich von Lehner, the film tells of the encounter between early National Socialists and their opponents.

== Cast ==
- Franco Nero: General Konrad von Der Berg
- Helmut Berger: Baron Erich von Lehner
- Olga Karlatos: Margarethe
- Eleonora Vallone: Jutta
- Franco Javarone: Klaus von Knobelsdorf
- Macha Méril: Elvira von Lehner
- Roberto Posse: Herbert von Lehner
- Franco Ressel: priest
