= Paul Graetz (producer) =

German-born French film producer

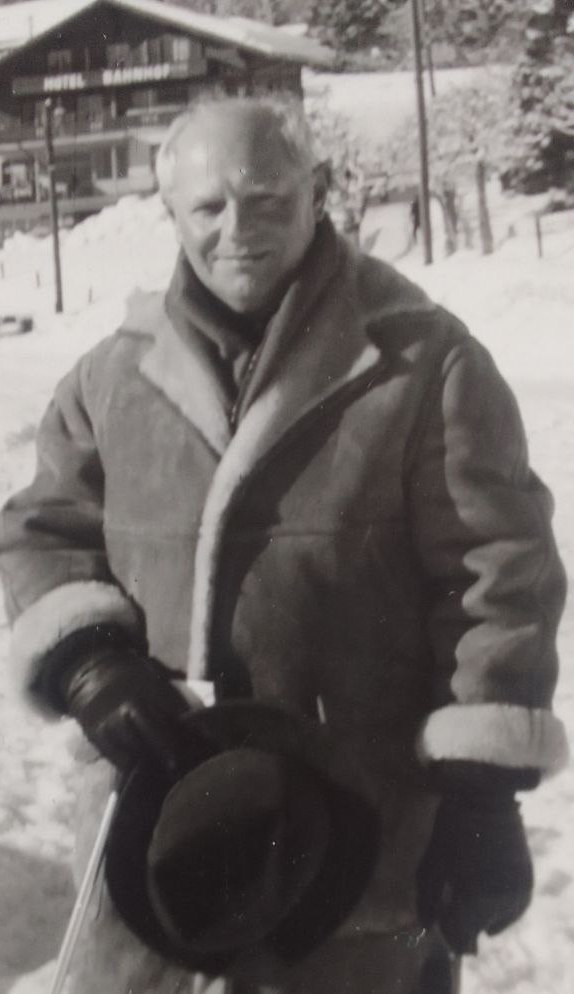
- Graetz in Switzerland c. 1960
- Born: 3 April 1899; Leipzig, German Empire
- Died: 5 February 1966 (aged 66); Paris, France
- Burial place: Père Lachaise Cemetery
- Occupation: Producer
- Years active: 1938–1966 (film)

Paul Graetz (1899 – 1966) was a German-born French film producer. Based in Paris in the 1930s, he established own production company Transcontinental Films. He died while production of his final film Is Paris Burning? was underway.

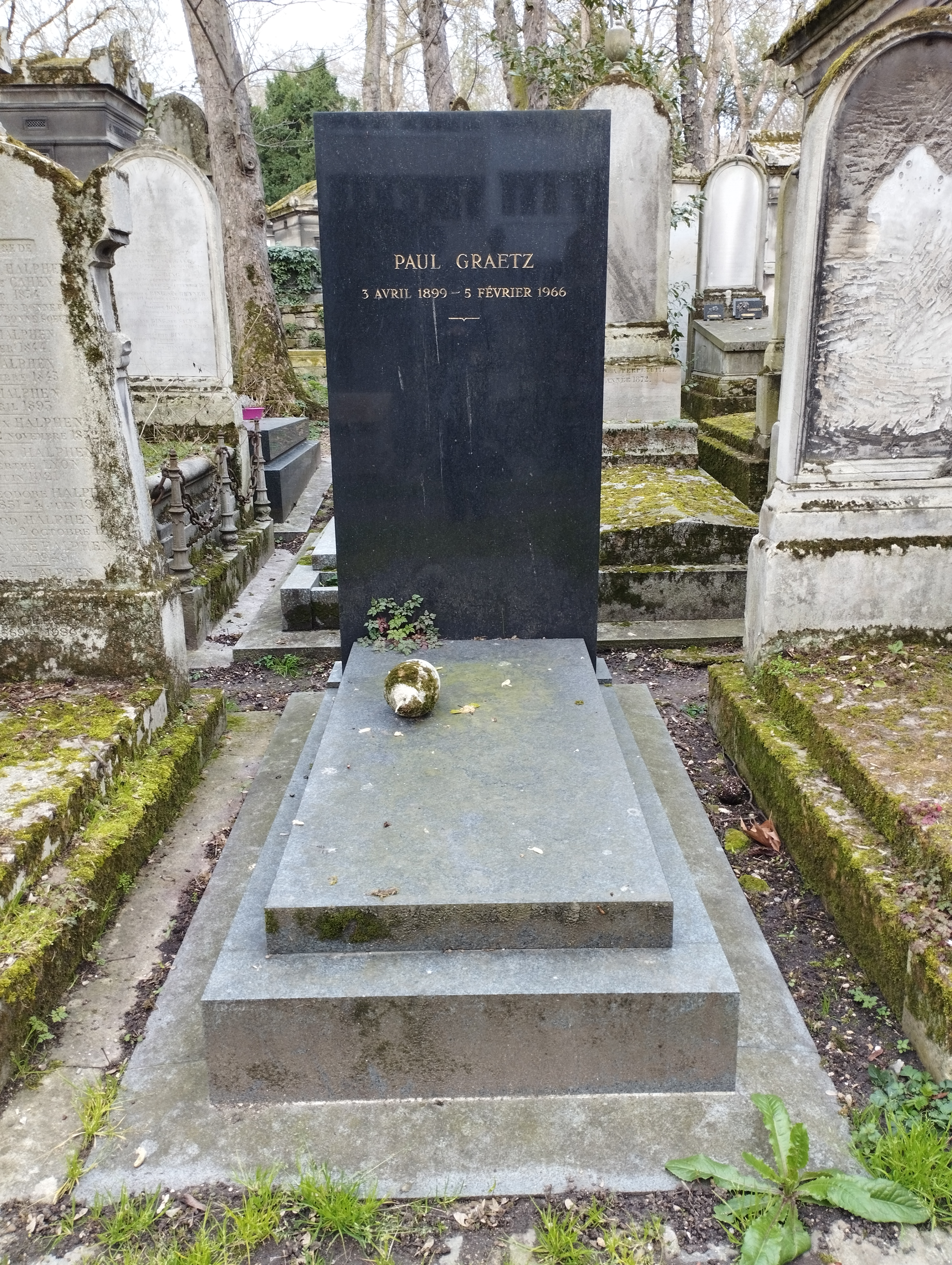
Paul Graetz's grave in the Père Lachaise Cemetery (division 7).

Paul Graetz is buried in the Père Lachaise Cemetery in Paris.

== Selected filmography ==
- The Phantom Wagon (1939)
- The Heart of a Nation (1943)
- Devil in the Flesh (1947)
- God Needs Men (1950)
- Rome 11:00 (1952)
- Knave of Hearts (1954)
- Men in White (1955)
- Bitter Victory (1957)
- From a Roman Balcony (1960)
- A View from the Bridge (1962)
- Girl's Apartment (1963)
- Is Paris Burning? (1966)

== Bibliography ==
- Johnson, William Bruce. Miracles & Sacrilege: Roberto Rossellini, the Church and Film Censorship in Hollywood. University of Toronto Press, 2008.
