= Johnny Johnson (musical) =

1936 American musical

- 1956 studio recording
- Music: Kurt Weill
- Lyrics: Paul Green
- Book: Paul Green
- Basis: Jaroslav Hašek's novel The Good Soldier Švejk
- Productions: 1936 Broadway; 1956 Off-Broadway; 1971 Broadway revival 2009 London concert staging

Johnny Johnson is a musical with a book and lyrics by Paul Green and music by Kurt Weill. It premiered in 1936 on Broadway.

Based on Jaroslav Hašek's 1921–1923 satiric novel The Good Soldier Švejk, the musical focuses on a naive and idealistic young man who, despite his pacifist views, leaves his sweetheart Minny Belle Tompkins to fight in Europe in World War I. He first tries to stop the war after meeting a young German sniper of the same name, who believes that the soldiers must unite. However, the commanders of the allied forces intend to use the discontent with the war among the German soldiers as a perfect time to advance in the war. Johnny then manages to bring the skirmish to a temporary halt by incapacitating a meeting of the generals with laughing gas, but once they recover they promptly reinstate the war, resulting in hundreds of thousands of fatalities. Meanwhile, Johnny finds himself committed to an asylum for ten years. He returns home to discover Minny Belle has married a capitalist, and he settles down as a toymaker who will create anything except tin soldiers, his personal gesture of peace in an increasingly warlike society.

The musical was written and composed by Green and Weill during the summer of 1936 in a rented old house located in Nichols, Connecticut near the summer rehearsal headquarters of the Group Theatre at Pine Brook Country Club. Its title was inspired by the fact the name appeared on United States casualty rolls more often than any other.

== Productions and background ==
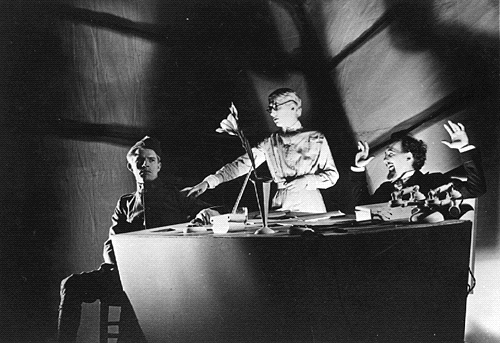
Photo from original Broadway production

Weill was asked to develop the project by the socially conscious Group Theatre, but much of his music was scrapped when original director Harold Clurman was replaced by Lee Strasberg, who opted to emphasize text over music. The Broadway production opened on November 19, 1936, at the 44th Street Theatre, where it ran for 68 performances. The cast included Russell Collins as Johnny and Phoebe Brand as Minny Belle, with Luther Adler, Morris Carnovsky, Lee J. Cobb, Curt Conway, John Garfield, Elia Kazan, Robert Lewis, and Sandy Meisner in supporting roles. It was the runner-up for Best American Play from the New York Drama Critics' Circle Award.

A 1956 production was presented Off-Broadway at the Little Carnegie Playhouse at Carnegie Hall. It was directed by Stella Adler and starred among others James Broderick as Johnny Johnson and Gene Saks as the Mad Psychiatrist. It ran from October 21, 1956, through October 28. Samuel Matlowsky was the musical director and conducted the 1956 record album which had none of the cast from the Stella Adler production.

After 10 previews, a revival directed by José Quintero and choreographed by Bertram Ross opened on April 11, 1971, at the Edison Theatre, where it closed after one performance. The cast included Ralph Williams as Johnny and Alice Cannon as Minny Belle.

The British premiere was staged by actors from the Royal Shakespeare Company in the Not the RSC Again festival at the Almeida Theatre, London in the Summer of 1986. There were no more than two performances of Johnny Johnson, which was directed by Paul Marcus. The title role was taken by Graham Turner with Beverley Klein as Minny Belle. Other roles were played by Martin Milman, Clive Mantle, Tina Marian, Michael McNally, Keith Osborne, Geraldine Wright, Patrick Bailey, David Summer and Andrew Yeats. Musical director was John Owen Edwards.

In 2009, a concert-staging was mounted in London by the Discovering Lost Musicals Charitable Trust, with Max Gold in the title role.

The ReGroup Theatre Company staged two sold-out staged readings that were directed by Estelle Parsons at the 47th St Theatre, in New York on December 12, 2011. Johnny was played by Pete McElligott, and his performances was named one of the 10 memorable performances of 2011 by Backstage.

== Recordings ==
A November 1956 studio recording ("MGM Records" MGM E 3447, later released on Heliodor, Polydor, and online at ArkivMusik.com) has Burgess Meredith as Johnny, Evelyn Lear as Minny Belle, and Hiram Sherman as the Mad Psychiatrist; smaller roles are taken by Jane Connell, Lotte Lenya, and Thomas Stewart, and the conductor is Samuel Matlowsky.

A November 1996 recording (Erato 0630-17870-2) offers Donald Wilkinson as Johnny, Ellen Santaniello as Minny Belle, and Paul Guttry as the Mad Psychiatrist; Joel Cohen conducts.

== Original Song List (Prior to Cuts) ==
=== Act One ===
"How Sweetly Friendship Binds"

- Over in Europe - Mayor, Men and Women
- Democracy Advancing - Minny Belle, Men and Women
- Up Chickamauga Hill - Grandpa Joe, Men and Women
- Democracy Advancing (Reprise) - Minny Belle, Mayor, Men and Women
- Interlude: Johnny's Melody - Orchestra

"Keep The Home Fires Burning"

- Aggie's Song - Aggie
- Oh, Heart of Love - Minny Belle
- Farewell, Goodbye - Minny Belle

"Your Country Needs Another Man-And That Means You"

- Captain Valentine's Tango (Part I) - Captain Valentine
- Democracy March - Orchestra
- Captain Valentine's Tango (Part II) - Captain Valentine
- Army Interlude - Orchestra

"Pack Up Your Troubles In Your Old Kit Bag"

- The Sergeant's Chant - Sergeant
- The West-Pointer's Song - West-Pointer and Soldiers

"A Light That Lighteth Men Their Way"

- Farewell, Goodbye (Interlude)/Johnny's Song (Underscore) - Orchestra
- Song of the Goddess - The Statue of Liberty

=== Act Two ===
"Lead Kindly Light"

- Song of the Wounded Frenchmen (Nous Sommes Blesses)- Wounded French Soldiers

"There Is One Spot Forever England"

- The Tea Song - An English Sergeant and English Soldiers
- Oh the Rio Grande - Private Harwood
- Johnny's Dream (Oh Heart of Love) - Minny Belle
- Song of the Guns - The Guns

"If Thine Enemy Hunger-"

- Music of the Stricken Redeemer - Orchestra

"'Tis Not So Deep As A Well-But 'Tis Enough. 'Twill Serve."

- Mon Ami, My Friend - A French Nurse

"In The Multitude Of Counselors There Is Safety"

- The Allied High Command - The Allied High Command
- Dance of the Generals (We'll All Be Home For Christmas) - The Allied High Command and Johnny

"Still Stands Thine Ancient Artifice"

- The Battle (with Reprise of the Dance of the Generals) - Johnny, American and German Soldiers

"There's Many A Mangled Body, A Blanket For Their Shroud"

- In Time Of War and Tumult (Almighty God/Almachtiger Gott) - English and German Priests

"Dulce et Decorum est pro patira mori"

- Song Of The Wounded Frenchmen (Reprise) - Orchestra

"Hail Mary, Full of Grace"

- Reminiscence - Orchestra

=== Act Three ===
"Is There No Balm in Gilead, Is There No Physician There?"

- The Psychiatry Song - Dr. Mahodan

"Out Of The Mouth Of Babes And Sucklings"

- Asylum Chorus - Members of the Debating Society
- Hymn to Peace (Round) - Members of the Debating Society
- Asylum Chorus (Reprise) - Orchestra

"Whither Have Ye Made A Road?"

- Johnny's Song - Johnny

== 1956 recording song list ==
This is the version with Burgess Meridith in the title role. Soloists are listed.

Side 1

- Overture
- Over in Europe - Thomas Stewart
- Democracy's Call
- Up Chuckamauga Hill - Hiram Sherman
- Johnny's Melody
- Aggie's Sewing Machine Song - Jane Connell
- Oh Heart of Love - Evelyn Lear
- Capt. Valentine's Tango - Scott Merrill
- Johnny's Speech - Burgess Meredith
- Song of the Goddess - Jean Sanders
- Song of the Wounded Frenchmen

Side 2

- Cowboy Song, The Rio Grande - Bob Shaver
- Johnny's Dream - Evelyn Lear
- Song of the Guns
- Music of the Stricken Redeemer
- Mon Ami My Friend - Lotte Lenya
- The Allied High Command
- The Laughing Generals
- In Times of Tumult and War
- Battle: Johnny's Arrest & Homecoming
- How Sweetly Friendship Binds
- The Psychiatry Song - Hiram Sherman
- Johnny's Song - Burgess Meredith

== 1971 revival song list ==
Act 1

- Over in Europe
- Democracy's Call
- Up Chuckamauga Hill
- Johnny's Melody
- Aggie's Song
- Oh Heart of Love
- Farewell, Goodbye
- The Sergeant's Chant
- Valentine's Tango
- You're in the Army Now (Interlude)
- Johnny's Oath
- Song of the Goddess
- Song of the Wounded Frenchmen
- Tea Song
- Cowboy Song
- Johnny's Dream
- Song of the Guns
- Music of the Stricken Redeemer

Act 2

- Mon Ami My Friend
- Allied High Command
- The Laughing Generals
- The Battle
- Prayer: In Times of War and Tumults
- No Man's Land
- Song of the Goddess (Reprise)
- The Psychiatry Song
- Hymn to Peace
- Johnny Johnson's Song
- How Sweetly Friendship Binds
- Oh Heart of Love (Reprise)
- Johnny's Melody

== See also ==
- List of anti-war songs
