= Alberto Bevilacqua =

Italian writer and film director

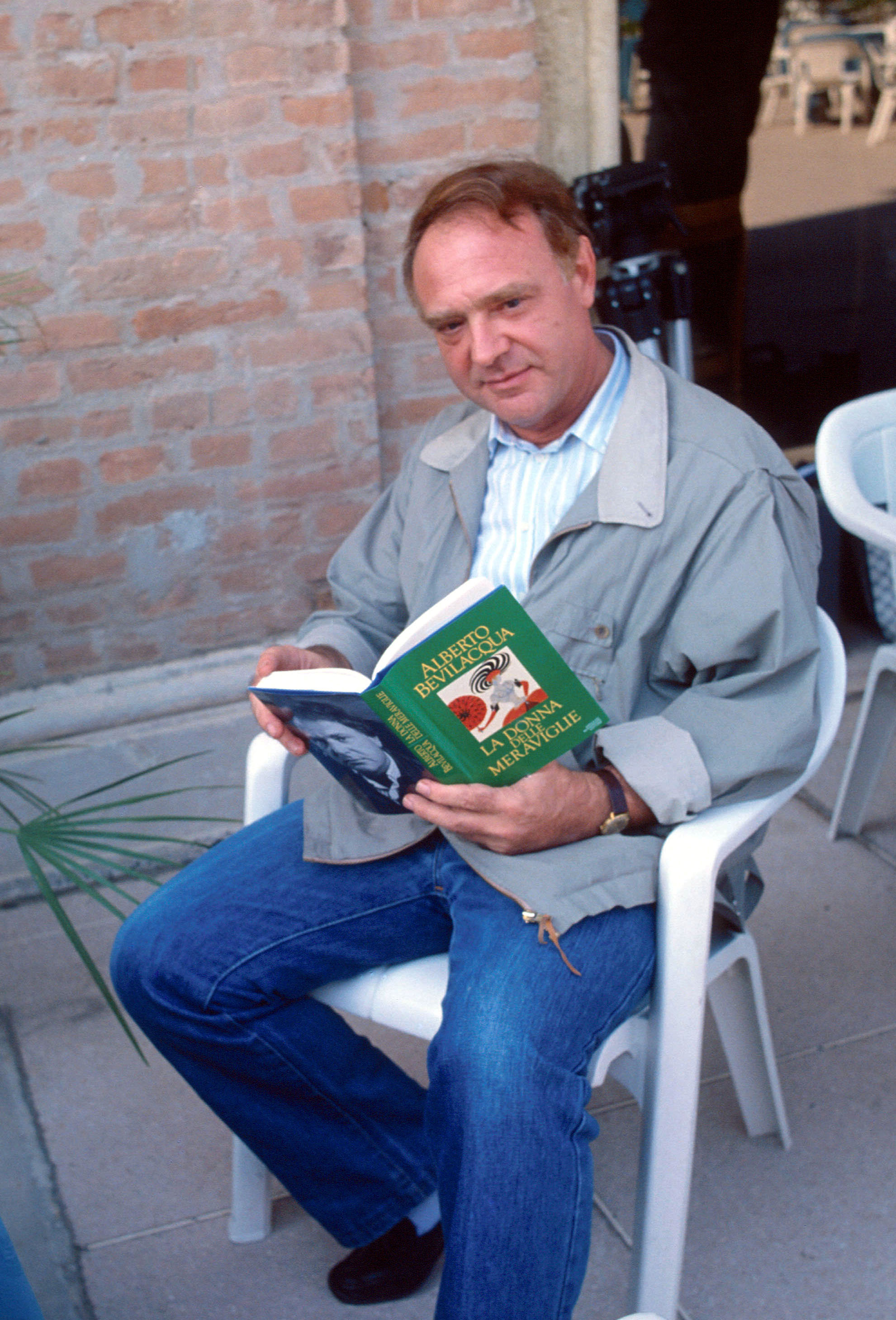
- Bevilacqua in 1984
- Born: 27 June 1934; Parma, Italy
- Died: 9 September 2013 (aged 79); Rome, Italy
- Occupations: Film director, screenwriter
- Years active: 1970–1999

Alberto Bevilacqua (27 June 1934 – 9 September 2013) was an Italian writer and filmmaker. Leonardo Sciascia, an Italian writer and politician, who read Bevilacqua's first collection of stories, The Dust on the Grass (1955), was impressed and published it. Mario Colombi Guidotti, responsible for the literary supplement of the Journal of Parma, began to publish his stories in the early 1950s.

Friendship Lost, his first book of poems, was published in 1961. Caliph, published in 1964, was his breakthrough novel. The protagonist, Irene Corsini, imbued with his own sweet and energetic temperament, is one of the strongest female characters in Italian literature. His novel This Kind of Love won the Campiello Prize in 1966. In both This Kind of Love and Caliph, Bevilacqua oversaw the adaptations and productions of the film versions. This Kind of Love won Best Film at Cannes.

Bevilacqua was also a poet. His writings have been translated throughout Europe, the United States, Brazil, China and Japan. In 2010, his seven "stories" as he liked to call them, were included in the Novels volume of the prestigious series "I Meridiani.”

Bevilacqua directed seven films between 1970 and 1999. His 1970 film Lady Caliph was entered into the 1971 Cannes Film Festival.

Bevilacqua, aged 79, died in Rome on 9 September 2013 from cardiac arrest. He had been hospitalized since 11 October 2012 for heart failure.

== Selected filmography ==
- Atom Age Vampire (1960)
- Lady Caliph (1970)
- Questa specie d'amore (1971)
- Attenti al buffone (1976)
- Le rose di Danzica (1979)
- Bosco d'amore (1981)
- Woman of Wonders (1985)

== Honour ==
- Italy: Knight Grand Cross of the Order of Merit of the Italian Republic (22 november 2010)
