= Alfred Hitchcock Presents season 4 =

Alfred Hitchcock Presents aired 36 episodes during its fourth season from 1958 to 1959.
Alfred Hitchcock Presents was nominated for a Primetime Emmy Award for Best Dramatic Series Less Than One Hour at the 11th Primetime Emmy Awards on May 6, 1959.

No. overall	No. in season	Title	Directed by	Written by	Stars	Original release date
118	1	"Poison"	Alfred Hitchcock	Story by : Roald Dahl; Teleplay by : Casey Robinson	Wendell Corey as Timber Woods, James Donald as Harry Pope	October 5, 1958
Malaya. Harry Pope (Donald) has been stuck in bed for hours because there is a venomous snake, a krait, on his stomach. His friend Timber Woods (Corey) calls a doctor but only reaches the assistant (Levy). Timber is flippant about the danger and makes fun of Harry. When Doctor Ganderbay (Moss) arrives, they administer various medicines to both Harry and the snake. They then help Harry stand up and there is no snake to be seen. Timber mocks Harry for his fear, but as soon as the doctor is gone, Timber lies on the bed and gets bitten and killed by the snake, which really did exist. Supporting Cast: Arnold Moss as Dr. Ganderbay, Weaver Levy as Dr. Ganderbay's Assistant
119	2	"Don't Interrupt"	Robert Stevens	Sidney Carroll	Chill Wills as Mr. Kilmer, Cloris Leachman as Mary Templeton, Biff McGuire as Larry Templeton, Peter Lazer as Johnny Templeton, Scatman Crothers as Timothy	October 12, 1958
The Templetons (McGuire and Leachman) are on a train with their young son, Johnny (Lazer), who they have trouble controlling, and who was just expelled from his private school. Mary is especially exasperated by Johnny's actions, while Larry just tries to keep up. When they get settled in their car, a radio announcement mentions that a mental patient has escaped from an institution. The train generator goes out in a blizzard, and the train conductor (Mulhall) tells them that it will be fifteen minutes or so before they get moving again. The Templetons offer Johnny one 1922 silver dollar if he can be quiet for 10 minutes while elderly cowboy Mr. Kilmer (Wills) tells a story. While the train is stopped, Johnny sees a man outside the window, caught in the blizzard and begging for help, but Johnny cannot speak up, having promised not to. After Kilmer's story ends, Johnny receives the silver dollar, but he drops it, and attendant Timothy (Crothers) collects and keeps it, despite a slight protest from the bartender (Glenn). Supporting Cast: Jack Mulhall as Conductor, Roy Glenn as Bartender, Geoffrey Lewis (believed to be the escaped mental patient) Interesting Note: Cloris Leachman and Biff McGuire were born in the same year (1926) and died in the same year (2021), both living to the age of 94, respectively.
120	3	"The Jokester"	Arthur Hiller	Story by : Robert Arthur; Teleplay by : Bernard C. Schoenfeld	Albert Salmi as Bradley the Reporter, Roscoe Ates as Pop Henderson, James Coburn as Andrews the Reporter	October 19, 1958
Reporter and practical joker Bradley (Salmi) pulls a prank on easily-confused morgue attendant Pop Henderson (Ates) by pretending to be a corpse and "coming alive". When Pop goes to get a police sergeant to confirm his findings, Bradley sneaks out, leaving Pop embarrassed. Pop is threatened with forced retirement by the police captain (Watts) for falling for the pranks of reporters such as Bradley, Andrews (Coburn), Morgan (Jostyn), and Dave (Kirkwood, Jr.). Bradley goes out to celebrate by heavily drinking and angers a woman named Millie (Carleton), a man named Mike (Benedict), and a bartender (Barron) with his practical jokes, and he is knocked out in a physical dispute with Mike and dumped outside on the street. When Bradley is later brought to the morgue presumed dead (but only actually paralyzed), Pop refuses to believe that Bradley's moaning is real and puts him inside the freezer. Supporting Cast: Claire Carleton as Millie, Baynes Barron as Bartender, Jay Jostyn as Morgan the Reporter, Arthur Batanides (credited as Art Batanides) as Police Sergeant, Richard Benedict as Mike, James Kirkwood, Jr. (credited as Jim Kirkwood, Jr.) as Dave, Charles Watts as Police Captain
121	4	"The Crooked Road"	Paul Henreid	Story by : Alex Gaby; Teleplay by : William Fay	Richard Kiley as Harry Adams, Walter Matthau as Officer Pete Chandler, Patricia Breslin as Mrs. Adams	October 26, 1958
Harry Adams (Kiley) and his wife (Breslin) are traveling on a rural road near a small town called Robertsville when they are waylaid and arrested by crooked police officer named Officer Chandler (Matthau), who is running an extortion racket with the assistance of the local auto mechanic, Charlie Brown (Erdman), and the equally corrupt town Judge Stanton (Watts). Chandler and partner Officer Andrew 'Andy' Bleeker (Dane) arrest passing tourists and forcing them to pay large meaningless fines. The Adamses leave after paying the fees ($95.50 to the court and $75.40 to the mechanic), but it turns out that they are undercover agents of the State Highway Commission, Special Investigations Committee, and have recorded everything on tape for the state and federal authorities to investigate the corrupt town. Supporting Cast: Richard Erdman as Charlie Brown, Peter Dane as Officer Andrew 'Andy' Bleeker, Charles Watts as Judge Stanton, Paul Frees as Off-Screen Announcer (voice only) (uncredited)
122	5	"The $2,000,000 Defense"	Norman Lloyd	Story by : Harold Q. Masur; Teleplay by : William Fay	Barry Sullivan as Mark Robeson, Leslie Nielsen as Lloyd Ashley, Herbert Anderson as John Keller	November 2, 1958
Lloyd Ashley (Nielsen) is accused of killing his wife Eve's (March) lover, Tom Ward, and is pressed at trial by prosecutor Mr. Merrick (Holmes), and Lloyd claims that the killing was accidentally caused by a safety flaw in the gun. Police weapons specialist John Keller (Anderson), the ballistics expert, testifies that the gun could not have been fired while the safety catch was engaged. Judge Cobb (Jerome) then adjourns the court, giving defense attorney Mark Robeson (Sullivan) time to challenge the expert statements. After pleading from Eve, Mark is offered two million dollars by Lloyd if he can get him an acquittal. Mark practices with the gun and succeeds in firing the weapon, but he shoots himself in the arm and has to call for a doctor (Lytton). Mark is then successful in refuting Keller's lack of experimentation and securing an acquittal, but as soon as Lloyd is released, he shoots Mark for also having an affair with Eve. Supporting Cast: Wendell Holmes as Mr. Herrick the Prosecutor, Lori March as Eve Ashley, Edwin Jerome as Judge Cobb, Herbert Lytton (credited as Herbert C. Lytton) as Doctor, Ralph Barnard as Court Attendee
123	6	"Design for Loving"	Robert Stevens	Ray Bradbury	Norman Lloyd as Charles Brailing / Robot, Marian Seldes as Lydia Brailing, Elliott Reid as Tom Smith, Barbara Baxley as Anne Smith	November 9, 1958
Charles Brailing (Lloyd) is tired of his wife, Lydia (Seldes), so he has a robot double of himself made by Marionettes, Inc. to take his place when he wants to get away. Charles' friend Tom (Reid), who feels smothered by his wife Anne (Baxley), finds out that Anne has already replaced herself with a robot double. In addition, Charles' robot double develops feelings for Lydia and turns on Charles, taking his place permanently by locking him in a storage cabinet and stealing his ticket to Rio de Janeiro, as well as his wife.
124	7	"Man with a Problem"	Robert Stevens	Story by : Donald Martin; Teleplay by : Joel Murcott	Gary Merrill as Carl Adams, Mark Richman as Officer Steve Barrett, Elizabeth Montgomery as Karen Adams	November 16, 1958
Carl Adams (Merill) climbs out a window onto the ledge of a high-rise Chicago hotel as people (Melton, Tayback, Rennie, and Field) gather and talk, some in horror, while others desire to see death. He is disconsolate over his wife Karen's (Montgomery) recent death; she committed suicide by overdosing on pills when her lover abandoned her. The hotel manager (Robinson) has the bellhop (Johnson) clear the floor and call the police while he attempts to convince Carl to come inside. They even call a psychiatrist doctor (Gerry) to try to talk Carl back inside. After some banter and finally with the permission of his lieutenant (Lynch), the patrolman on duty, Officer Steve Barrett (Richman), joins Carl on the ledge to rescue him, but this turns out to fulfill Carl's plot: Steve is Karen's lover; he had recently spurned her, precipitating her suicide. Once Carl is secured by a rope lasso, he tells Steve of the plot and who he really is, then pushes Steve off the ledge to his death. Supporting Cast: Bartlett Robinson as Hotel Manager, Ken Lynch as Police Lieutenant, Sid Melton as Cab Driver, Vic Tayback as Man Talking to Cab Driver, Alex Gerry as Doctor, James Johnson as Bellhop, Jean Field as Screaming Lady, Guy Rennie as Cab Driver Note: The three photographers are uncredited and currently unknown.
125	8	"Safety for the Witness"	Norman Lloyd	Story by : John De Meyer; Teleplay by : William Fay	Art Carney as Cyril T. Jones	November 23, 1958
1927. Mild-mannered gun shop owner Cyril T. Jones (Carney) sales a hunting rifle to a Mrs. Crawpit (Lloyd) before Police Lieutenant Flannery (Bray) enters and questions if Jones has recently sold a gun to gangster Dan Foley (Davis), who is currently associating himself with fellow gangster Joe Felix (Flavin). Later, Jones witnesses a murder committed by Foley and Felix, who then shoot him. Nurse Copeland (Scott) protectively watches over Jones, even forcing Police Commissioner Cummings (Westerfield) and Flannery out of his room. Even the hospital cashier (Lord) shows tender concern for him upon his discharge. Distrustful of the police's ability to protect him, Jones checks in with a hotel desk clerk (Fresco) for a room with a good vantage point and kills the gangsters with Mrs. Corbett's recently purchased rifle before mailing the gun to Topanga, California and turning himself in to the police. Cummings, Flannery, and the District Attorney (Greco), fearful that their reputation will be ruined by Jones' accomplishment, refuse to arrest him.; Supporting Cast: James Flavin as Joe Felix, Robert Bray as Lieutenant Flannery, James Westerfield as Police Commissioner Cummings, Doris Lloyd as Mrs. Jefferson Crawpit (the Gun Store Customer), Karl Davis as Dan Foley, Mary Scott as Nurse Copeland, George Greco (credited as George Greico) as Tom the District Attorney, Dorothea Lord as Hospital Cashier, David Fresco as Hotel Desk Clerk
126	9	"Murder Me Twice"	David Swift	Story by : Lawrence Treat; Teleplay by : Irving Elman	Phyllis Thaxter as Lucy Pryor, Tom Helmore as Miles Farnham	December 7, 1958
At a dinner party, hypnotist Miles Farnham (Helmore) demonstrates his skills on Lucy Pryor (Thaxter) in the presence of her husband William (Marshal), as well as friends George (Anderson) and Adele Thompson (Carr). She speaks in old-fashioned English, claims to be "Dora Evans" in Philadelphia the year 1853, and kills her husband (Marshal) with a pair of scissors. Lucy and Farnham are questioned by District Attorney William Burke (Costello) and assistant Mr. Sherman (Calder). Farnham then approaches Lucy to blackmail her, but she has servant Alma (Lawton) escort him out. During the inquest headed by Mr. Carson (Carson), the court clerk (Seel) reads out the details before testimony is given. Farnham insists that Lucy was inhabited by the spirit of Dora Evans, a real woman who killed her husband in 1853. Farnham hypnotizes Lucy to prove this, but during the testimony "Dora" stabs Farnham, killing him. Lucy is set free, and when a journalist questions her if she planned it all, she replies, "Wouldst not thee like to know." Supporting Cast: Herbert Anderson as George Thompson, Alan Marshal as William Pryor, Ward Costello as District Attorney William G. Burke, King Calder as Mr. Sherman, Bob Carson (credited as Robert Carson) as Mr. Carson, Alma Lawton as Alma, Liz Carr as Adele Thompson, Charles Seel as Court Clerk
127	10	"Tea Time"	Robert Stevens	Story by : Margaret Manners; Teleplay by : Kathleen Hite	Margaret Leighton as Iris Teleton, Marsha Hunt as Blanche Herbert, Murray Matheson as Oliver Teleton	December 14, 1958
At a prominent club, the Maitre d (Feld) escorts Blanche Herbert (Hunt), the mistress of Oliver Teleton (Matheson), to the table of Iris Teleton (Leighton), Oliver's wife. Iris calmly orders from the waiter (Navarro) while confronting Blanche about the affair. Iris is threatened with blackmail by Blanche, who wants them to divorce and possesses an incriminating letter about an affair had by Iris. Iris tries to buy the letter back with a significant amount of expensive jewelry, but Blanche demands $100,000. In retaliation, Iris kills Blanche, hoping to frame Oliver for the murder by placing one of his buttons in Blanche's hand and the gun in Oliver's coat pocket. However, Iris was seen by a private detective hired by Oliver (Matheson), and while Iris listens in to Oliver's conversation, he reveals that the letter is a copy and he set up Blanche to take the fall, as she wanted only money. He is still planning to divorce Iris for an even younger blonde mistress (Austin), who stuns Iris when she passes her in the office. Supporting Cast: Fritz Feld as Maitre D, George Navarro as Waiter, Angela Austin as Young Blonde
128	11	"And the Desert Shall Blossom"	Arthur Hiller	Story by : Loren D. Good; Teleplay by : Bernard C. Schoenfeld	William Demarest as Tom Akins, Roscoe Ates as Ben White, Ben Johnson as Sheriff Jeff	December 21, 1958
Nevada desert. Sheriff Jeff (Johnson) visits elderly cowboys Tom Akins (Demarest) and Ben White (Ates) to inform them that they are in danger of being taken away from their desert property by the town council, even though they have been mining gold there since 1892. Sheriff Jeff says that they must prove that some plant will grow at their property within the month to officially be homesteading, or they will be forced to move, and Tom says that a rose bush is set to bloom within the month. One night while Ben is fixing rabbit stew for dinner, a criminal (Kellin) from New York stops by having taken the wrong road, as he was heading to Reno, and his car's carburetor has broken down. When they invite him into their cabin, he threatens them with a gun, even striking Tom in the head, as he wants them to guide him to Reno, almost fifty miles away. However, the cowboys manage to kill him when Tom shoots him with an old revolver. Three weeks later, when Sheriff Jeff and Deputy Tex (Lau) arrive to inspect the property and search for the wanted killer, Akins and White proudly show off a lush rosebush, secretly grown using the criminal's body as fertilizer, thusly proving the fertility of their land and allowing them to stay. Supporting Cast: Wesley Lau as Deputy Tex, Mike Kellin as Killer
129	12	"Mrs. Herman and Mrs. Fenimore"	Arthur Hiller	Story by : Donald Honig; Teleplay by : Robert C. Dennis	Mary Astor as Mrs. Fenimore, Russell Collins as Bill Finley, Doro Merande as Mrs. Herman	December 28, 1958
Mrs. Herman (Merande) has a plan to kill her wealthy but paranoid and eternally cranky 72-year-old uncle Bill Finley (Collins), but she needs a conspirator. She picks former actress Mrs. Fenimore (Astor), who agrees to the plan for a fee of $2500. Mrs. Fenimore uses her acting skills to make herself desired by Finley and eventually gains access to his room, which allows Mrs. Herman to open a gas valve to poison him as he sleeps. The next day, after a police detective (Lau) declares the scene to be an accidental death, Mrs. Fenimore reveals to Mrs. Herman that she secretly married Finley before his death and that she will inherit his fortune, instead of Mrs. Herman. However, Mrs. Fenimore agrees to leave $2500 for Mrs. Herman as "a deal is a deal". Supporting Cast: Wesley Lau as Police Detective
130	13	"Six People, No Music"	Norman Lloyd	Story by : Garson Kanin; Teleplay by : Richard Berg	John McGiver as Arthur Motherwell, Peggy Cass as Rhoda Motherwell	January 4, 1959
Poughkeepsie, New York, September 1958. Undertaker Arthur Motherwell (McGiver) goes home to his wife Rhoda (Cass) and tells her a fantastic story involving recently deceased businessman Stanton C. Barryvale (Smith). In the story, Motherwell is visited by attorney Fulton Agnew (Graff) regarding lavish burial preparations for Barryvale, including thirty limousines and a string quartet. Motherwell has some financial issues with his business, as he cannot give a promised raise to his assistant of five years, Thor (Baker). After the attendant (Hamilton) brings in the body, Motherwell is shocked when Barryvale briefly wakes up in the funeral parlor to demand that his funeral be simple and cheap, with six people and no music, one car, and a pine box. After discussing the matter with wife Rhoda, Motherwell burns Barryvale's handwritten instructions and decides to follow the instructions of Barryvale's lawyer Agnew for a lavish funeral instead. Supporting Cast: Howard Smith as Stanton C. Barryvale, Joby Baker as Thor, Wilton Graff as Fulton Agnew, Joseph Hamilton (credited as Joe Hamilton) as Attendant
131	14	"The Morning After"	Herschel Daugherty	Story by : Henry Slesar; Teleplay by : Rose Simon Kohn	Robert Alda as Ben Nelson, Jeanette Nolan as Mrs. Trotter, Dorothy Provine as Sharon Trotter, Fay Wray as Mrs. Nelson	January 11, 1959
Mrs. Trotter (Nolan) is unhappy that her daughter Sharon (Provine) is having an affair with married businessman Ben Nelson (Alda), who is twice her age and has promised to divorce his wife for over a year but has all his assets, including his plastics company, listed in his wife's name. Mrs. Trotter travels to Ben's office and is led by the secretary (Statten) to see Ben, to whom she first appeals to let Sharon go free, but he attempts to outline his case for staying married while dating Sharon. Mrs. Trotter than visits Ben's home and is led by the maid (Lord) to Ben's wife, Mrs. Nelson (Wray), revealing the affair to her. That night Mrs. Nelson reveals what she knows to Ben, and she promises to set Ben free from both her and her money. Ben kills his wife and calls Sharon to set his alibi, but Mrs. Trotter takes the phone call instead and deliberately gives Sharon the wrong information so that Ben will go to jail. Supporting Cast: Dorothea Lord as Maid, Lyn Statten as Secretary (uncredited)
132	15	"A Personal Matter"	Paul Henreid	Story by : Brett Halliday; Teleplay by : Joel Murcott	Wayne Morris as Bret Johnson, Joe Maross as Joe Philips	January 18, 1959
Joe Philips (Maross) is lead engineer on a tunneling project in Mexico, and he is having problems with both tunnel collapses and scared staff, such as Pedro (DeKova) and Manuel (Strong). After a rough collapse, a doctor (Bermudez) arrives to help nurse Maria treat him. Bret Johnson (Morris) mysteriously arrives to be his assistant for the project's last six weeks when boss Mr. Roderiguez (Silvera) comes to check on Philips. One night Philips hears a radio newscast about an ongoing manhunt of an engineer who murdered his colleague; this prompts Philips to search through Johnson's things to find his true identity, but he is stopped when Johnson pulls a gun on him. Philips gives Pedro money to acquire him a gun, but Pedro tells Maria and she then tells Johnson. Since there is no way to leave the site for six weeks, the men work together to finish the job, despite their suspicions of each other. The tunnel is completed one day before the deadline, and it is revealed that Philips is the murderer, and Johnson is the police officer who traveled there to arrest him. Johnson waited to reveal the truth because he had a deal with Roderiguez to finish the tunnel job first. Supporting Cast: Frank Silvera as Mr. Roderiguez, Frank DeKova as Pedro, Anna Navarro as Nurse Maria, Leonard Strong as Manuel, Richard Bermudez as Doctor
133	16	"Out There – Darkness"	Paul Henreid	Story by : William O'Farrell; Teleplay by : Bernard C. Schoenfeld	Bette Davis as Miss Fox	January 25, 1959
Elderly widow Miss Fox (Davis) mistakenly and emphatically accuses her dog walker, Eddie (Congdon), whom dog Vanessa loves dearly, of having robbed her to Sergeant Kirby (Albertson) after Eddie had previously asked her for $50 for his twenty-year-old fiancé's lung operation and she denied him. With Eddie off for the night, Miss Fox had to walk Vanessa, and she was attacked and robbed for $180 cash and her beloved ring in the alley, where she is then found by doorman Jerry (Marshall). She learns of her error after a year, during which time Eddie served a wrongful prison sentence and his fiancé died in the hospital. Miss Fox had even let the real attacker go in the police station, as she was so focused on accusing Eddie. Miss Fox tries to make it up to Eddie after he is released by getting him his job back and gifting him $500, but he strangles her as revenge and dumps the money on her body. Supporting Cast: Frank Albertson as Sergeant Kirby, James Congdon as Eddie McMahon, Arthur Marshall as Jerry the Doorman
134	17	"Total Loss"	Don Taylor	J.E. Selby	Nancy Olson as Jan Manning, Ralph Meeker as Mel Reeves	February 1, 1959
When Jan Manning (Olson) and employee Evelyn 'Evie' Wilson discuss Manning's financial problems with her dress shop and Manning finds out that she cannot borrow any more money from bank manager Michael Selwin (Bryan). Her friend and clothing supplier Mel Reeves (Meeker) offers to burn down the shop so that she can collect the insurance money from the fire while he and Jan get quite drunk, leading Jan's sister (Lord) to be concerned for her. Reeves wants to partner with Jan on a new store after the insurance payout. That night, Jan gets a call that the shop is on fire, and she gets there in time to be informed and questioned by the fire chief (Teal), who is coordinating with a fireman (Beck) trying to stop the blaze. After the shop burns down that very night and employee Evelyn (Storey) suffers third-degree burns as a result, Jan confesses to insurance investigator Frank Voss (Willock) about the plan with Reeves. However, the investigator has found that the fire source was actually Jan's overheated kettle, which was accidentally set for 1:00 AM instead of 1:00 PM. Jan realizes that it truly was an accident, but the investigator does not believe her. Supporting Cast: Dave Willock as Frank Voss (the Insurance Investigator), Jack Bryan as Michael Selwin (the Bank Manager), Ruth Storey as Evelyn 'Evie' Wilson, James Beck (credited as Jim Beck) as Fireman Jim, Ray Teal as Fire Chief, Barbara Lord as Jan's Sister
135	18	"The Last Dark Step"	Herschel Daugherty	Story by : Margaret Manners; Teleplay by : William Fay	Robert Horton as Brad Taylor, Fay Spain as Leslie Lenox	February 8, 1959
Brad Taylor (Horton) wants to marry his new girlfriend Janice Wright (Meadows), but his other girlfriend, wealthy Leslie Lenox (Spain), refuses to let him go, saying that she owns him as she has funded venture after venture of his, as well as purchasing all his belongings. Brad takes Leslie swimming and drowns her in the ocean, but when he returns home, he is arrested by Detectives Breslin (Ellis) and Langley (Carlile) for the murder of Janice, whom Leslie had previously stabbed to death (and then returned the knife to Brad at the beach). Supporting Cast: Joyce Meadows as Janice Wright, Herb Ellis as Detective Breslin, David Carlile as Detective Sergeant Langley
136	19	"The Morning of the Bride"	Arthur Hiller	Story by : Neil S. Broadman; Teleplay by : Kathleen Hite	Barbara Bel Geddes as Helen Brewster, Don Dubbins as Philip Pryor	February 15, 1959
1956. Helen Brewster (Bel Geddes) is frustrated that her boyfriend Philip Pryor (Dubbins) has been stalling their wedding for almost five years on the excuses of his serving in the Korean War and that his mother's health is quite precarious. She flashes back to when roommate Pat (Hitchcock) helped calm her nerves when Philip revealed that he was to be shipped off to Korea. Even when he returns and gets a job at a publishing company, he still delays for his mother, Mary Langley Pryor. Helen travels to Philip's home to see his mother but is quickly rebuffed by a woman declaring that no one is home, only to find out from Philip that his mother is bedridden; Philip claims that the woman is Mrs. Beasely (Conrad), the housecleaner. When they finally do get married, Helen learns that Philip's mother has been dead since 1949, but Philip believes that she is still alive due to his insanity.; Supporting Cast: Pat Hitchcock as Pat, Helen Conrad as Mrs. Beasely
137	20	"The Diamond Necklace"	Herschel Daugherty	Sarett Rudley	Claude Rains as Andrew Thurgood, Betsy von Furstenberg as Thelma Thurgood	February 22, 1959
Elderly Andrew Thurgood (Rains) talks with even more senior doorman Henry (Jackson) when Henry drops a case of jewelry just as boss George Maynard (Hewitt) arrives to tell Andrew of his plans for the shop. Andrew is let go by Maynard from the Maynard and Company jewelry firm after 37 years of loyal service. On his last day, a very expensive Brazilian diamond necklace (worth $181,500) is stolen by a thief (von Furstenberg) who claims to be the wife of noted Doctor Anton Rudell (Bekassy), which is only discovered after real wife Jessica (Lord) arrives. Andrew is "distressed" at the breaking of his perfect record of having no thefts throughout the duration of his employment, but the thief is secretly Andrew's daughter, Thelma, and they worked together to carry out the theft. Andrew reveals to his daughter that the only other two thefts in the company's history were those committed by Andrew's father and grandfather; one theft per generation is a family tradition. Andrew is surprised at his home by his former boss Maynard with retirement gifts and, upon meeting Andrew's daughter, Maynard rewards Thelma with a job to replace the outgoing Thurgood, not knowing that she is the thief in question. Supporting Cast: Alan Hewitt as George Maynard, Stephen Bekassy as Dr. Anton Rudell, Selmer Jackson as Henry, Dorothea Lord as Jessica, Peter Walker as Jewelry Salesman, Norman Dupont as Jewelry Salesman
138	21	"Relative Value"	Paul Almond	Story by : Milward Kennedy; Teleplay by : Frances Cockrell	Denholm Elliott as John Manbridge, Torin Thatcher as Felix Edward Manbridge	March 1, 1959
England, 1930. John Manbridge (Elliott), a gambler and financial squanderer, plots to murder his cousin Felix (Thatcher) in the hopes of inheriting his fortune after Felix threatens John with the possible filing of criminal charges for forgery. John returns to London and visits bookie Benny (Burke) regarding prospective bets and the forged check that provoked Felix's anger. He then has a drink at the bar of Tom Crockett (Trayne) to establish an alibi before quickly going back to Felix's manor. Felix, who is secretly terminally ill with no more than three months to live, has committed suicide by drinking poisoned whiskey after servant Betts (Worlock) went on holiday and Felix is looked after only by Mrs. Simpson (Glessing). John, ignorant regarding Felix's illness, clubs him with a fire poker, not knowing that Felix was already dead. John then hides outside until Constable Longdon (Harvey) rides by on his bicycle in order to pretend that he has just arrived. When John is informed of Felix's plan by Constable Longdon, who finds the suicide note, he faints. A police inspector (Conway) and sergeant (Gould-Porter) conduct an investigation and question various individuals before revealing the body of John, with the inspector correctly identifying the situation as it played out. Constable Longdon innocently gave John some of the poisoned whiskey to revive and calm him, and John unwittingly drinks the poisoned whiskey as well, killing himself. Supporting Cast: Frederick Worlock as Mr. Betts, Walter Burke as Benny, John Trayne as Tom Crockett, Molly Glessing as Mrs. Simpson, Barry Harvey as Constable Longdon, Tom Conway as Inspector, Arthur Gould-Porter (credited as A.E. Gould-Porter) as Police Sergeant
139	22	"The Right Price"	Arthur Hiller	Story by : Henry Slesar; Teleplay by : Bernard C. Schoenfeld	Eddie Foy Jr. as "the Cat", Allyn Joslyn as Mort Barnhardt	March 8, 1959
Burglar "the Cat" (Foy Jr.) breaks into the home of couple Mort (Joslyn) and Jocelyn (Dulo) Barnhardt, who are also business partners in women's apparel and constantly fight about money. Mort and the Cat negotiate a deal for the Cat to steal items of value and Mort to collect on insurance and get a tax break for robbery, but the Barnhardt's have little of value in their home worth stealing. Local policeman Joe stops by to check on the light, due to burglaries in the area, and Mort wants to use his appearance as an alibi. Mort offers the Cat $3,500 to kill Jocelyn, but Jocelyn makes a counteroffer of $5,000, so the Cat kills Mort instead. Supporting Cast: Jane Dulo as Jocelyn Barnhardt Note: The actor who played policeman Joe is uncredited and currently unknown.
140	23	"I'll Take Care of You"	Robert Stevens	Story by : George Johnson; Teleplay by : William Fay	Ralph Meeker as John Forbes, Russell Collins as "Dad", Elisabeth Fraser as Dorothy Forbes	March 15, 1959
John Forbes (Meeker), a cheap car salesman, constantly complains about his wife Dorothy's (Fraser) spending habits to his employee and loyal assistant 'Dad' (Collins, who has a loving relationship with his wife of forty-seven years, Kitty (Moore)). One night John runs his wife over with his car and covers up the murder with the help of Dad. While John speaks with the police detectives (Rust, Batanides), Dad sells the car in question to college students (Westmoreland, Evans, Gering) for fifty dollars. Dad hopes that John will take care of him to return the favor and presses him for help monetarily while at the carnival, but John instead frames Dad for the murder by planting the headlight in Dad's house. Supporting Cast: Ida Moore as Kitty, Richard Evans as Harry, Richard Rust as Detective Charlie, James Westmoreland (credited as Rad Fulton) as Lester, Arthur Batanides as Police Detective, Richard 'Dick' Gering as Teen
141	24	"The Avon Emeralds"	Bretaigne Windust	Story by : Joe Pidcock; Teleplay by : William Fay	Roger Moore as Inspector Benson, Hazel Court as Lady Gwendolyn Avon, Alan Napier as Sir Charles Harrington	March 22, 1959
Inspector Benson (Moore) is tasked with preventing Lady Gwendolyn Avon (Court) from smuggling her emerald necklace out of the country, which would therefore cheat the estate tax requirement and form the charge of defrauding the treasury. Benson outlines the basics of the case with supervisor Sir Charles Harrington (Napier) and Sergeant Hodges (Harvey), with Harrington detailing the attempts of an American to purchase the necklace. Lady Avon thwarts Benson and his officers at every turn and manages to leave the country with her Aunt Catherine (Flynn) and without the necklace on her, as the uninsured necklace was "stolen" from the hotel safe where it was kept at her orders (rather than be safely kept in the local bank). Even hotel personnel Mr. Saunders (Clanton) and Ives (Lupino) did not want to keep the valuable necklace in the hotel, and a government assayer (Mudie) had previously confirmed its status. Benson and two other police officers follow and frequently search her to seek the necklace's whereabouts, but French police Commissionaire Jouin Clement (Mercier) refuses to help. However, Benson and Avon are secretly lovers, and Benson carried the necklace for her the entire time. In the end, Lady Avon is successful at selling the necklace for $250,000, tax-free of course. Supporting Cast: Ralph Clanton as Mr. Saunders, Gertrude Flynn as Aunt Catherine Sedley, Richard Lupino as Ives, Louis Mercier as Commissionaire Jouin Clement, Barry Harvey as Police Sergeant Hodges, Leonard Mudie as Assayer (uncredited) Note: The actor who played Fletcher/Bos, the hotel waiter, is uncredited and currently unknown. The actor who played the American buyer is uncredited and currently unknown.
142	25	"The Kind Waitress"	Paul Henreid	Henry Slesar	Olive Deering as Thelma Tompkins, Celia Lovsky as Sara Mannerheim, Rick Jason as Arthur	March 29, 1959
Hotel waitress Thelma (Deering) and the maître d' (Hokanson) discuss Thelma's favorite customer, regular Sara Mannerheim (Lovsky), before Sara arrives and informs Thelma that she is in her will as the one who will inherit all her wealth. Sara, who is quite ill, has stopped taking her medicine in expectation of death. Thelma's money-hungry boyfriend Arthur (Jason) suggests that they speed things up by slow-poisoning Sara with anatine, a leaf extract. After a number of days of poisoning her, Thelma tells Arthur that she has to stop, but when Arthur threatens to leave her, Thelma gives in. After half a year of no change, Thelma strangles Sara to death one night in frustration. At the inquest headed by the grand jury foreman (Carson), Dr. Maxwell (Zaremba) outlines the method of death before Thelma is called to testify before the grand jury and county clerk (Seel). It is revealed that Sara's physician, Dr. Lacey (Meredith), had prescribed anatine for her heart condition, and Thelma had been inadvertently keeping her alive. Supporting Cast: John Zaremba as Dr. Maxwell, Bob Carson (credited as Robert Carson) as Grand Jury Foreman, Charles Seel as County Clerk, Charles Meredith as Dr. Lacey, Mary Alan Hokanson as Maitre d'
143	26	"Cheap Is Cheap"	Bretaigne Windust	Albert E. Lewin and Burt Styler	Dennis Day as Alexander Gifford	April 5, 1959
Miserly Alexander Gifford (Day) narrates of when he decided to kill his wife, Jennifer (Backes), after she started spending money on herself (when she found over $33,000 held in six different bank accounts) and threatened divorce. Alex knows that he cannot commit a violent act of murder himself, so he explores various options, most of which he considers to be too expensive. He visits the county jail to solicit mobster Monk McGinnis (Richards), talks to a hitman (Lambert) sent by Monk (but considers $500 too much money), and talks to scientist Arthur (Essler) regarding poisons (but considers $600 too much for poisoned perfume). He ends up giving her food poisoning (botulism) himself through her ham dinner, which a doctor (Clarke) confirms could be fatal in a large quantity. When she appears to be recovering, Alex smothers her with a pillow. After she dies, he finds out that it would cost $160 to bury her with a funeral, so he sells her cadaver to a medical university for $75 instead. Supporting Cast: Alice Backes as Jennifer Gifford, Frank Richards as Monk McGinnis, Fred Essler as Arthur, Jack Lambert as Hitman, Gage Clarke as Doctor
144	27	"The Waxwork"	Robert Stevens	Story by : A. M. Burrage; Teleplay by : Casey Robinson	Barry Nelson as Raymond Houston, Everett Sloane as Mr. Marriner	April 12, 1959
London, 1954. Reporter Raymond Houston (Nelson) stays overnight in a London wax museum (in the Murderers' Den section) in order to write an important article ("A Night with Marriner's Murderers"). He speaks with various employees and workers (Palmer, Perry), some of whom are not actually real people. He gets to view workers (Fairfax, McKinnon) hard at work to create the perfect replicas. Raymond is desperate as he owes a sizeable gambling debt and is being threatened with prosecution for a bad check. Mr. Marriner (Sloane), the chief sculptor of the wax figures, is depressed that the death penalty will soon be outlawed, and therefore he will have no new figures to introduce after that of the murderous barber Bourdette (Ophir). Raymond is warned not to smoke by one guard (Westwood) and is wished good luck by another guard (Davis). Raymond, who is claustrophobic, hallucinates that several of the figures (Thompson, Conroy, O'Leary) are moving and that one of the wax figures (Bourdette) is alive (and who says that he is the actual murderer and escaped from custody), converses with him, and then has his throat cut by the figure. Raymond is found dead the next morning as the museum staff brings the actual Bourdette wax figure into the den. Supporting Cast: Shaike Ophir as Bourdette, Hal Thompson as Morris, Laurence Conroy as Armstrong, John O'Leary as Harry, Betty Fairfax as Mrs. Nop, Charles Davis as Museum Guard, Patrick Westwood as Murderers' Row Guard, Mavis Neal Palmer as Museum Attendant, Vincent Perry as Museum Workman, Dorothy McKinnon as Museum Employee
145	28	"The Impossible Dream"	Robert Stevens	John Lindsey	Franchot Tone as Oliver Mathews, Carmen Mathews as Miss Hall, Mary Astor as Grace Dolan	April 19, 1959
Has-been actor Oliver Mathews (Tone) films a murder scene with actress Myra Robbins (Windust), whom he now despises. Although he is praised by crew members (Kruse, Raven, Ames) for his performance, he is angry that he is killed off in the opening scene. Oliver's assistant, Miss Hall (Mathews), chases off the wardrobe attendant (O'Malley), as she is in love with Oliver, having both written fan letters to him and paid others to do the same in order to boost his ego. Oliver is being blackmailed weekly by Grace Dolan (Astor) for an affair he had with Grace's late daughter Janice. The blackmail scheme has broken Oliver financially, yet Grace continues to push him by threatening to reveal his seductive letters written to Janice. Having had enough, Oliver murders Grace with poisoned alcohol and dumps her body in deep water, an act that is hazily witnessed by a young woman (Lloyd) with her date (Jeffries). Miss Hall has been rebuffed for years, but she uses her instincts to read Oliver's mood and follows him the night of the murder. Having been so in love with him for so long, she only requests him to have a relationship with her in order to keep her from going to the authorities, which he obliges. Supporting Cast: Irene Windust as Myra Robbins, Josie Lloyd (credited as Suzy Lloyd) as Young Female Lover in car, Pat O'Malley as Wardrobe Attendant, Richard Jeffries (credited as Dick Jeffries) as Male Lover in car, William D. Kruse as Crew Member, Harry Raven as Crew Member (uncredited), Don Ames as Crew Member (uncredited)
146	29	"Banquo's Chair"	Alfred Hitchcock	Story by : Rupert Croft-Cooke; Teleplay by : Francis Cockrell	John Williams Inspector Brent, Kenneth Haigh as John Bedford, Reginald Gardiner as Major Cook-Finch	May 3, 1959
Blackheath, England, 1903. Former Inspector Brent (Williams) conspires with friends, staff, and Police Major Cook-Finch (Gardiner) to stage a fake haunting in the hopes of scaring John Bedford (Haigh) into confessing to the murder of his aunt, Ms. Ferguson. He speaks with butler Lane (Pelling) to set up the scene and with actor Robert Stone (Adrian) to sell the performance. Brent invites Bedford to attend dinner on the anniversary of the murder, as there is supposedly new incriminating evidence to be revealed. Brent arranges for an actress, Mae Thorpe (Plowright), to sneak into the house dressed as Ms. Ferguson and walk past their dinner room when the main course is being served. The plan is successful, and Bedford explosively confesses when he sees the menacing figure of his aunt. After Bedford is arrested by Police Sergeant Balton (Dillon), Brent and the others are shocked when Mae Thorpe suddenly arrives and says that she was late and missed the dinner entirely. Supporting Cast: Hilda Plowright as Mae Thorpe, Max Adrian as Robert Stone, Tom Dillon (credited as Thomas P. Dillon) as Sergeant Balton, George Pelling as Lane
147	30	"A Night with the Boys"	John Brahm	Story by : Henry Slesar and Jay Fob; Teleplay by : Bernard C. Schoenfeld	John Smith as Irving Randall, Joyce Meadows as Frances Randall	May 10, 1959
Irving Randall (Smith) loses his weekly work wages ($96) in a poker game to his unsympathetic boss Smalley (Buffington), who also defeats Manny (Carlile) and another player (Kruse). Irving previously admired Smalley but resents him for pressing him to keep playing. Afterward, while walking to Smalley's home to get vouchers, Irving is stopped by a police officer (Nelson) who warns him about frequent stabbings in the neighborhood, so Irving stages an assault before going home. Irving then lies to his pregnant wife Frances (Meadows) that he was mugged while going to collect vouchers from his boss' house. Irving reluctantly makes a police report at Frances' insistence and is surprised when the police arrest a sixteen-year-old boy named Whitey (Martin) as a suspect. Irving hesitantly takes Whitey's money ($92) but feels guilty and conflicted, and he refuses to press charges. He and Whitey separate on amicable terms. The next day, Irving learns that Whitey had in-fact mugged Smalley, and the money that he had was Smalley's poker winnings (largely won from Irving). When Smalley requests a few dollars until payday, Irving declines with the excuse that he's a married man. Supporting Cast: Sam Buffington as Smalley, David Carlile as Manny, Buzz Martin as Whitey, Joe De Santis as Police Lieutenant, William D. Kruse as Card Player, Dick Nelson as Police Officer
148	31	"Your Witness"	Norman Lloyd	Story by : Helen Nielsen; Teleplay by : William Fay	Brian Keith as Arnold Shawn, Leora Dana as Naomi Shawn	May 17, 1959
Arnold Shawn (Keith) is a ruthless defense lawyer (his wife notes that he has the skill to make the innocent seem guilty) who uses his arguing skills to put down his wife Naomi (Dana) and defend his cheating on her. He states that it is because of the vanity of the species, that the girl doesn't mean anything to him, that his wife is just old-fashioned, that his wife is not 25 years old any longer, and that their 10 years together should be enough collateral to overcome his continued dalliance. Naomi attends all of Arnold's court proceedings to watch him destroy and disqualify witnesses and their statements, with him particularly destroying the testimony of Kenneth Jerome (Hutton). Arnold is served by friend Al Carmody (Harmon), who helps him prepare for the courtroom destruction of Henry Babcock (Hansen) in front of the judge (Glass) and prosecutors (Heffley, Wynn). When Arnold goes to see the judge to disqualify Babcock, Naomi tells him that she is divorcing him after judicial clerk Dan Irwin (Jones) leaves. When Arnold refuses to divorce Naomi as it is "clumsy and professionally awkward" and suggests that she seek her own affair, she instead hits him with her car by the courthouse, killing him. The only witness of the "accident" is Henry Babcock, the very man whose credibility as an eyewitness in court Arnold had just destroyed. Babcock tells the police officer (Maxwell) to take the lady's word for it as it is a legal fact that he is not a competent witness. Supporting Cast: John Harmon as Al Carmody, William Hansen as Henry Babcock, Brian G. Hutton as Kenneth Jerome, G. Stanley Jones as Dan Irwin, Paul Maxwell as George the Police Officer, Gordon Wynn as Attorney George Vogel, Everett Glass as Judge, Wayne Heffley as Prosecutor Note: The actor who played the court officer is uncredited and currently unknown.
149	32	"Human Interest Story"	Norman Lloyd	Fredric Brown "The Last Martian"	Steve McQueen as Bill Everett, Arthur Hill as Yangan Dall / 'Howard Wilcox', Clint Eastwood as Newsman (uncredited),	May 24, 1959
Reporter Bill Everett (McQueen) receives a tip from his editor Cargan (McVey) about a man in a local bar with a wild tale. The bartender (Challee) sets up an unofficial interview with a couple of beers to entice the man to participate and loosen him up. Bill interviews the distressed man (Hill) who claims to be an 8-foot-tall incarcerated Martian named Yangan Dall (with 6-fingered hands) residing in the human body of 'Howard Wilcox' (as whom he retains the memories of both Yangan and Howard). Yangan tells Bill how all the other 100 million Martians just vanished one day and he was forced to break out of 'Scar' prison over a period of 3 days to avoid starvation. He took a Martian airplane ('targan') to the ceremonial field north of the capital city ('Ondenel') where he discovered the rotting remains of his people, yet he concluded that it was not caused by the incurable disease 'krill' that had wiped out over 400 million of his people (as that disease causes a Martian body to wither and not rot) or by mass suicide (considered a terrible crime). He then found a mental control machine on a copper platform that transported him to Earth, inside a human body walking down the street. Bill and Yangan travel to 'Howard's' home to pacify his worrying wife (Anderson) with a story about old friends meeting and losing track of time (Yangan is convinced by Bill to lie as 'Howard' as he cannot lie as a Martian). When the kind-hearted Yangan suggests telling everyone his story (starting with wife Elsie, with whom there are no secrets between Howard and she), they go for a walk and Bill kills him (not being able to trust Yangan with the truth, as his IQ of 20 is only roughly around that of an average human). Bill, editor Cargan, and even bartender Barney are also Martians, but part of an invasion force trying to take over Earth. Supporting Cast: Tyler McVey as Cargan, William Challee as Barney Welch, Anne Anderson as Elsie Wilcox
150	33	"The Dusty Drawer"	Herschel Daugherty	Story by : Harry Muheim; Teleplay by : Halstead Welles	Dick York as Norman Logan	May 31, 1959
Norman Logan (York), who lives at Mrs. Merrell's (Sessions) boarding house with Colonel Binns (O'Malley) and Mrs. Bradford (Grace), has for months been pestering fellow boarder William Tritt (Coolidge), a banker, to return $200 that Tritt mistakenly took from Logan's account, but to no avail. Logan sends Tritt notes and hounds him at his residence. Frustrated, Logan carries out a series of pranks (he buys a toy gun from a salesman (Brooks) and orders Tritt to get him $10,000 and then hides the gun in a drawer on multiple occasions) to make Tritt lose his credibility at the bank with boss Mr. Pinkson (Graff). He comes into the bank every day and whistles Christmas tunes to tear at Tritt's nerves. Logan's final act is to actually rob the bank of $10,000, which Tritt is blamed for when Pinkson and guard Lewis (Dearing) fail to find the money on Logan. Afterward, Logan returns the money in Tritt's name with a confession letter, except for $200 to replace the money that Tritt took from him. Supporting Cast: Philip Coolidge as William Tritt, Wilton Graff as Mr. A.M. Pinkson, J. Pat O'Malley as Colonel Binns, Almira Sessions as Mrs. Merrell, Edgar Dearing as Lewis, Charity Grace as Mrs. Bradford, Barry Brooks as Toy Store Salesman
151	34	"A True Account" "Curtains for Me"	Leonard Horn	Rupert Croft-Cooke	Jane Greer as Mrs. Cannon-Hughes / Ms. Cannon-Hughes / Mrs. Cannon-Hughes-Brett, Kent Smith as Gilbert Hughes, Robert Webber as Paul Brett, Jocelyn Brando as Alice	June 7, 1959
Mrs. Cannon-Hughes (Greer) visits a lawyer, Paul Brett (Webber), and his secretary, Mrs. Simpson (Lord), to tell him of her suspicions that her husband, Gilbert Hughes (Smith), murdered his first wife. She had been the nurse to his wife, Mary (Kennedy), who she felt disliked her and soon died under her care. Afterward, Gilbert asked her out and they began dating, so she moves out of her shared apartment with roommate and fellow nurse Alice (Brando). After they married and went on honeymoon, Cannon-Hughes reported that Gilbert acted out giving his wife a fatal dose of medicine while sleepwalking. In addition, she states that he watches her at all times. Soon afterward, Gilbert dies, supposedly of suicide due to an unbalanced mind, and a reverend (Jackson) presides over his funeral while Brett watches. Ms. Cannon-Hughes and Brett begin a relationship and get married, but when Brett accidentally discovers that Ms. Cannon-Hughes-Brett killed both Gilbert and his first wife (by her talking in her sleep about giving an extra dose of medicine), she kills him as well after hearing recordings of her new husband's findings, with her destroying the recordings in the fireplace. Supporting Cast: Madge Kennedy as Mary Hughes, Dorothea Lord as Mrs. Simpson, Selmer Jackson as Reverend, Lillian O'Malley as Housekeeper
152	35	"Touché"	John Brahm	Story by : Bryce Walton; Teleplay by : William Fay	Paul Douglas as Bill Fleming, Robert Morse as Phil (Phillip Baxter, Jr.)	June 14, 1959
Bill Fleming (Douglas), former professional prizefighter and lumber tycoon, is upset that his wife, Laura (Heath), is cheating on him with a man named Baxter (Marlowe), a former close friend of his. Bill wants to fight and beat Baxter with his fists, but his hands would legally be considered lethal weapons. While being served drinks by waiter Otto after hunting, Bill's new friend, Phil (Morse), points out a California law on duels that could work in his favor (as "an affair of honor"), and Phil offers to act as his attorney in order to obtain an acquittal. Bill challenges Baxter to a duel (on Phil's urging) with sabres and kills him in his home and in front of his wife. Bill goes to the police station and confesses to his police officer friend Dan (Flavin). Bill is acquitted after being questioned by attorney George Faber (Calder), receiving congratulations by spectators (Knight) outside of the courtroom, but the judge (Carson) rules that Bill has to pay a hefty allowance ($100,000 up front plus $1000 per month for life) to Baxter's only child for life. Bill then learns that Phil is Baxter's son (Phillip Baxter, Jr.) and is also Laura's lover; Phil and Laura plotted together to gain Bill's money and get Baxter out of the way. Supporting Cast: Hugh Marlowe as Phillip Baxter, Dodie Heath as Laura Fleming, James Flavin as Dan, King Calder as George Faber, Bob Carson (credited as Robert Carson) as Judge, Charlott Knight as Elderly Woman Note: The actor who played Otto the waiter is uncredited and currently unknown. The actor who played the police officer outside of the courtroom is uncredited and currently unknown.
153	36	"Invitation to an Accident"	Don Taylor	Wade Miller	Gary Merrill as Joseph Pond, Joanna Moore as Virginia Pond	June 21, 1959
At a dinner party, Albert Martin (Hewitt) confronts his close friend Virginia Pond (Moore), who is having an affair with her ex Cam (Walker); this is related to host Mrs. Bedsole (Barrier) by Albert. Her suspicious husband, Joseph Pond (Merrill), offers to host any guest that his wife might desire to invite to dinner, so Virginia invites Albert to a dinner prepared by servant Flora (O'Malley). Albert fears that Virginia is going to be harmed or killed by her jealous husband Joseph due to her affair with her ex, and indeed Virginia is knocked out by a falling scaffolding plank that night while strolling with Albert. Joseph says it must have been an accident caused by the wind, but Albert realizes that there was no wind that night. A container of arsenic also mysteriously disappeared, with Joseph falling ill with symptoms of arsenic poisoning (which Albert believes was accidental in Joseph's planning to kill Virginia). Albert goes on a beach fishing trip with Joseph to warn him off, but Joseph confronts Albert first, revealing that he is an expert 'accident man' who meant for the plank to kill Albert. Joseph admits that Albert has been poisoned through his coffee (as Joseph has built up a tolerance to arsenic). As Albert is dying, he weeps and tells Joseph that he has the wrong man, admitting that it was Cam who made Joseph a cuckold instead. Supporting Cast: Alan Hewitt as Albert Martin, Peter Walker as Cam, Lillian O'Malley as Flora, Ernestine Barrier as Mrs. Bedsole, Bess Flowers as Party Guest (uncredited), Voorheis J. Ardoin as Party Guest (uncredited)
