= Margaret Craven =

Margaret Craven may refer to:

- Margaret Craven (politician) (born 1944), American politician in Maine
- Margaret Craven (writer) (1901–1980), American author
- Peggy Lloyd, formerly Craven (1913–2011), American actress
