= Julie Gregg =

American actress (1937–2016)

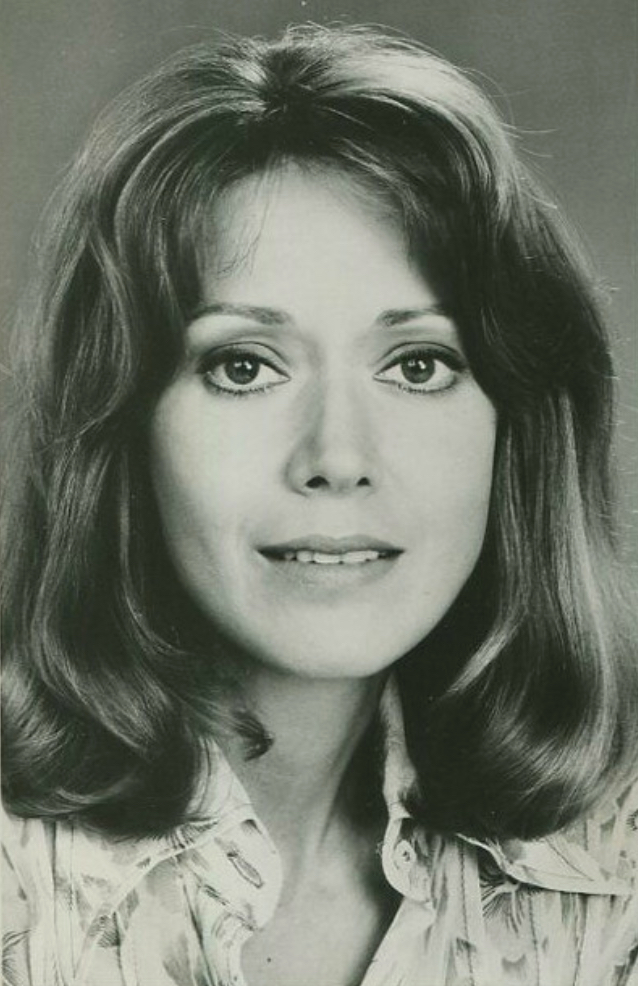
- Gregg in Mobile One (1975)
- Born: Beverly Marie Scalzo; January 24, 1937; Niagara Falls, New York, U.S.
- Died: November 7, 2016 (aged 79); Los Angeles, California, U.S.
- Education: University of Southern California
- Occupations: Stage; television; film actress
- Years active: 1964–1994
- Known for: The Godfather; The Happy Time

Julie Gregg (born Beverly Marie Scalzo; January 24, 1937 – November 7, 2016) was an American television, film and stage actress.

She is best known for her portrayal of Sandra Corleone in The Godfather (1972). Also notably, she was nominated for the Tony Award for Best Featured Actress in a Musical for her performance as Laurie Mannon in the 1968 musical The Happy Time, directed by Gower Champion and featuring music by John Kander & Fred Ebb.

== Early life and education ==
Gregg was born in Niagara Falls, New York, the daughter of Italian parents Victoria (née LaRocca) and Casper Louis Scalzo. She moved to California to attend the University of Southern California on a music scholarship.

== Career ==
=== Television ===
Gregg's first television role was in 1964, as a nurse in McHale's Navy. She guest starred in dramatic and comic roles on television shows in the 1960s, 1970s, and 1980s. She appeared on Bewitched in two different guest roles: in "Double Split" (1966), season 2, episode 64, and in "The Crone of Cawdor" (1967), season 3, episode 101. In the latter episode, she played a crone who stole the youth of mortal men when she kissed them, which she tried but failed to do with Darrin Stephens. She appeared in episodes 33 and 34 of Batman in 1966, and played a nightclub singer in the film Batman (1966).

In 1970, she appeared in The Virginian episode "The Gift" (season 8, episode 24), portraying a saloon girl who is targeted by the partner of a bank robber who dies in her room after hiding his loot. Also in 1970, she starred in an episode of Mannix titled "Fly, Little One" (Season 3, Episode 21), as one of the psychologists taking care of a mentally disturbed little girl Pamelyn Ferdin who was targeted for death by criminals who thought she had overheard their plans for stealing negotiable bonds from the psychology clinic. In 1971, she made a guest appearance as Beth Wilson in season 16, episode 19 of the long-running CBS Western series Gunsmoke. She had a recurring role as Abby Graham in Banyon, an NBC detective series that aired from 1972 to 1973; in this period drama, set in Los Angeles in the late 1930s, Abby Graham is a nightclub singer constantly trying to encourage her boyfriend, Banyon (Robert Forster), to settle down and marry her, but to no avail. In 1974, she appeared in The F.B.I. episode "Survival" (season 9, episode 23), it was the very final episode of the show's nine-year run. She played Mrs. Sandra Taggart.

Among her guest roles in the late 1960s and early 1970s were two separate episodes of Mission: Impossible, where she again played different characters. In 1969, in season 4, episode 91 "Amnesiac", she played Monique, an Impossible Missions Force operative. That was the season when the show had no permanent female operative because Barbara Bain, who played Cinnamon Carter in seasons 1–3, had resigned, and Lesley Ann Warren, who played Dana Lambert in season 5, had not yet signed on. Then in 1970, in season 5, Gregg played Anna Kerkoska, a premier's daughter who needed rescuing, in "Decoy", episode 112. Anna fell in love with Jim Phelps, who rescued her by driving her across the border in a specially outfitted, low to the ground, automobile that could drive under the border gate. Gregg also guest starred in two season 2 episodes of Hawaii Five-O: "Savage Sunday", as a revolutionist, and "The One with the Gun", as the wife of a man shot after a crooked card game.

In 1975, Gregg was cast in a starring role in the short-lived ABC drama series, Mobile One. She played Maggie Spencer, a television news assignment editor, in all 11 episodes with co-star Jackie Cooper. The show was cancelled in January 1976. In 1978, she appeared as Susan in the episode "The Two-Million-Dollar Stowaway" of the NBC crime drama series The Eddie Capra Mysteries, and as Edna Clapper in the 1979 miniseries The Seekers.

Gregg's last television role was as Sally in the "Thanksgiving" (1987) episode on Showtime's Brothers.

=== Film ===
Gregg's first credited film role was also in 1967, in From Hell to Borneo, which was shot on location in the Philippines. She received second billing in that movie to George Montgomery. She played the role of Sandra Corleone in The Godfather, and reprised her role in The Godfather Part II, but the scene was subsequently cut. However it does appear in the television version of The Godfather Saga.

Apart from an uncredited appearance as a nightclub singer in the 1966 film version of Batman, her only musical film role was as Antonia, Don Quixote's niece, in Man of La Mancha in 1972. In that movie, she was featured in the song I'm Only Thinking of Him. Her other film roles were in The Kill Reflex (1989), starring Fred Williamson and Maud Adams, and the thriller Dead On in 1994.

=== Stage ===
Gregg was also a stage actress and singer, a veteran of national tours of Fanny and How to Succeed in Business Without Really Trying. She also portrayed Julie LaVerne in Show Boat on tour in 1981.

Her only appearance on Broadway was as school teacher Laurie Mannon in John Kander and Fred Ebb's 1968 musical production of The Happy Time. She replaced Linda Bennett in that role just before the New York opening. Her opening day performance was well received by the critics, who noted her "enchanting voice, looks, and personality."

Gregg received a Tony Award nomination for her performances in The Happy Time, in the category Featured, i.e., supporting, Actress (Musical). Her co-star in the musical, Robert Goulet won the Tony that year for best actor in a musical. She did win a Theatre World Award for the 1967–68 season for her debut performance.

== Death ==
Gregg died of cancer on November 7, 2016, aged 79, in the Van Nuys neighborhood of Los Angeles.

== Filmography ==
Film
Year	Title	Role	Notes
1964	From Hell to Borneo	Marjorie Bellflower	
1966	Batman	Finella	Season 1 Episode 33
1970	The Virginian	Sally Anne	Season 8 Episode 24 (The gift)
1972	The Godfather	Sandra Corleone	
1972	Man of La Mancha	Antonia Quijana	
1974	The Godfather Part II	Sandra Corleone	Uncredited
1978	The Eddie Capra Mysteries	Sarah Quinn	Episode: "The Two Million Dollar Stowaway"
1979	The Seekers	Edna Clapper	
1989	The Kill Reflex	Nancy Gillespie	
1994	Dead On	Jillian Marks	(final film role)
