= Merciless Man =

1976 film

- Film poster
- Directed by: Mario Lanfranchi
- Written by: Mario Lanfranchi
- Starring: Tony Lo Bianco
- Cinematography: Federico Zanni
- Music by: Franco Micalizzi
- Release date: 4 December 1976
- Running time: 92 minutes
- Country: Italy
- Language: Italian

Merciless Man (Italian: Genova a mano armata) is a 1976 crime film directed by Mario Lanfranchi and starring Tony Lo Bianco.

== Cast ==
- Tony Lo Bianco - The American
- Maud Adams - Marta Mayer
- Adolfo Celi - Lo Gallo
- Barbara Vittoria Calori (as Barbara Romana Calori)
- Howard Ross - Caleb
- Fiona Florence
- Luigi Bonos
- Yanti Somer - Mayer's henchwoman
