= Nairobi Affair =

1984 film directed by Marvin J. Chomsky

Nairobi Affair is a 1984 made-for-television action film starring Charlton Heston, Maud Adams and John Savage. It was directed by Marvin J. Chomsky and written by David Epstein.

== Production and release ==
Shooting occurred on location in Kenya during 1984. In a 1984 interview, Charlton Heston noted that the title "Nairobi Affair" was misleading since it was mostly shot in rural areas rather than urban areas. The film would premiere in the United States on CBS during October 1984.
