= Mobile One (TV series) =

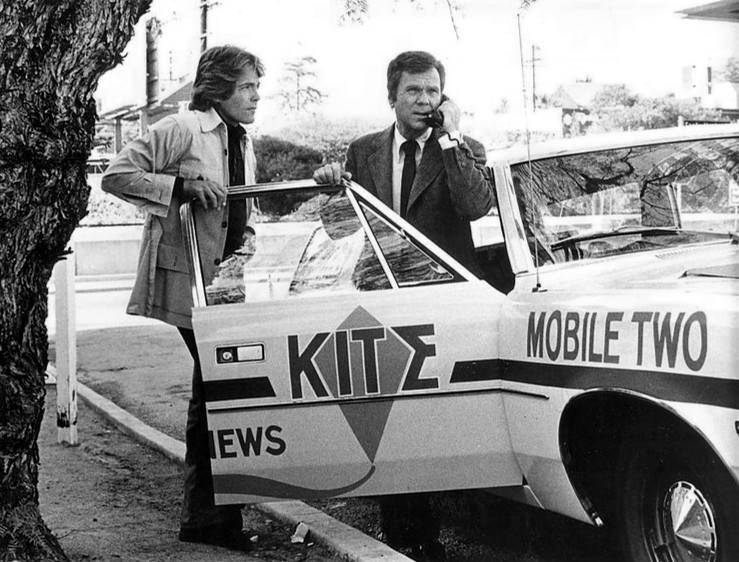
- Mark Wheeler and Jackie Cooper
- Genre: Drama
- Created by: James M. Miller
- Starring: Jackie Cooper; Julie Gregg; Mark Wheeler
- Country of origin: United States
- Original language: English
- No. of seasons: 1
- No. of episodes: 13 (plus pilot)

Production
- Executive producer: Jack Webb
- Producer: William Bowers
- Running time: 50 minutes
- Production companies: Mark VII Limited; Universal Television

Original release
- Network: ABC
- Release: September 12, 1975 – January 5, 1976

Mobile One is an American television series that aired on the ABC network from September 12, 1975 to January 5, 1976. The show was a production of Jack Webb's Mark VII Limited for Universal Television. It was the only Mark VII Limited show to air on ABC.

== Premise ==
Unlike most of Mark VII's other productions, Mobile One was not based on the real-life exploits of a police force or any other governmental agency. The show was set instead in a local television station's electronic news gathering operation, which at the time was a very new technology. Jackie Cooper starred as on-screen reporter Peter Campbell; Julie Gregg played Maggie Spencer, Campbell's producer; and Mark Wheeler played camera operator Doug McKnight. Much of the show was spent covering Campbell and McKnight's travels to the scenes of crimes, accidents, and other newsworthy events in a mobile unit car, thereby resembling Mark VII's Emergency! (which concurrently aired on NBC) in an emphasis upon action and adventure.

== Episodes ==
No.	Title	Directed by	Written by	Original release date
0	Mobile Two	David Moessinger	James M. Miller, David Moessinger, Leo Pipkin	September 2, 1975
90-minute TV-movie pilot.
1	"The Informant"	Don Taylor	Unknown	September 12, 1975
2	"The Pawn"	E.W. Swackhamer	Unknown	September 19, 1975
3	"Roadblock"	Paul Krasny	Unknown	September 26, 1975
4	"The Bank Job"	Don Taylor	Unknown	October 3, 1975
5	"The Reporter" "Life Preserver"	George Sherman	Unknown	October 10, 1975
6	"Not by Accident"	George Sherman	Unknown	October 17, 1975
7	"Californium 252"	Don Taylor	Unknown	October 27, 1975
8	"The Crusader"	Joseph Pevney	Unknown	November 3, 1975
9	"The Middle Man"	Arnold Laven	Unknown	November 17, 1975
10	"The Boxer"	Joseph Pevney	Unknown	December 1, 1975
11	"The Listening Ear"	George Sherman	Unknown	December 22, 1975
12	"Murder at Fourteen"	Joseph Pevney	Unknown	December 29, 1975
13	"Libel"	George Sherman	Unknown	January 5, 1976

== Production notes ==
The show was produced by William Bowers and created by James M. Miller; Cooper also directed at least one episode. ABC initially scheduled the show on Friday nights against NBC's Sanford and Son and Chico and the Man and CBS' M*A*S*H; it moved to Monday nights starting on October 27, 1975. Ratings were poor and the network cancelled the series after only thirteen episodes.

The 90-minute pilot film for the series, Mobile Two, aired on ABC on September 2, 1975.
