= The Kill Reflex =

1989 action film directed by Fred Williamson

- Film poster
- Directed by: Fred Williamson
- Written by: Jaron Summers
- Starring: Fred Williamson; Maud Adams; Bo Svenson; Phyllis Hyman; D.R. Jones
- Cinematography: Alan Thatcher
- Music by: Arni Egilsson; Mike Logan
- Production companies: Epic Productions; Po' Boy Productions
- Distributed by: Vision International; Sony Pictures Home Entertainment
- Release date: June 1, 1989 (United States)
- Running time: 94 minutes
- Country: United States
- Language: English

The Kill Reflex also known as Soda Cracker is a 1989 American action-crime film directed by and starring Fred Williamson. The movie was written by Jaron Summers based on his own novel and was released in the United States on June 1, 1989.

== Plot ==
Soda Cracker, a veteran cop, must unveil the mysterious murder of his former partner while he fights against the mafia and corrupt policemen.

== Cast ==
- Fred Williamson as Soda Cracker
- Maud Adams as Crystal Tarver
- Bo Svenson as Ivan Moss
- Phyllis Hyman as Irene
- D.R. Jones as Ace Moss
- Julie Gregg as Nancy Gillespie

== Release ==
=== Reception ===
SteveQ from the blog "Down Among the Z Movies" called "The Kill Reflex", Williamson's worst movie and wrote: "Fred Williamson has been in a number of entertaining blaxploitation films, but this one, which he also directed, is a mess." In the website "Bulletproof Action", the reviewer stated: "Soda Cracker is not going to win any sort of groundbreaking trailblazer awards. It features elements we have seen time and time again in cop related action flicks and unless you are a big Fred Williamson fan, I wouldn’t go out of my way to watch Soda Cracker. This one is nestled right in between below average and not worth watching."
