= The Christian Licorice Store =

1971 film

- Theatrical release poster
- Directed by: James Frawley
- Written by: Floyd Mutrux
- Produced by: Michael Laughlin; Floyd Mutrux
- Starring: Beau Bridges; Maud Adams; Gilbert Roland
- Cinematography: David L. Butler
- Edited by: Richard A. Harris
- Music by: Lalo Schifrin
- Production company: Cinema Center Films
- Distributed by: National General Pictures
- Release date: November 24, 1971
- Running time: 90 minutes
- Country: United States
- Language: English

The Christian Licorice Store is a 1971 American drama film directed by James Frawley and starring Beau Bridges and Maud Adams. The title of the film is based on lyrics from the song "Pleasant Street" by Tim Buckley, who makes a cameo in the film.

== Plot ==
Promising tennis pro Franklin Cane lives in Los Angeles and is mentored by his coach, Jonathan "J.C." Carruthers, who warns him of the perils of success. J.C. advises him to concentrate on his game and not on outside interests, such as a lucrative offer to endorse a hair spray in a TV ad.

Cane takes his advice. He wins a tournament in Houston and has a one-night stand there with a girl, cheating on Cynthia Vicstrom, the photographer he has been seeing. Things are going well for Cane until one day J.C. dies peacefully in his sleep.

A distraught Cane begins going to wild California parties and spending time on Hollywood interests, neglecting Cynthia and his tennis. Cynthia breaks up with him and begins seeing Monroe, a film director who has fallen for her. Cane leaves a party with a girl he's just met, drives down the Pacific Coast Highway at a high speed, then crashes, killing them both. The next time she turns on a TV, Cynthia sees him in a breakfast-drink ad.

== Cast ==
- Beau Bridges as Franklin Cane
- Maud Adams as Cynthia
- Gilbert Roland as J.C.
- Allan Arbus as Monroe
- Jean Renoir as himself
- Monte Hellman as Joseph

== Release ==
The film opened November 24, 1971 at the Paris Theatre in Boston, Massachusetts and at four theaters in Detroit, Michigan.

== Reception ==
While the film was not a box office success, Barbara Leigh has stated that director Roger Vadim was so impressed by her performance that he asked her to be in Pretty Maids All in a Row.
