= The Old Man in the Cave =

- The Twilight Zone episode
- Episode no.: Season 5 Episode 7
- Directed by: Alan Crosland, Jr.
- Teleplay by: Rod Serling
- Based on: a short story "The Old Man" by Henry Slesar
- Production code: 2603
- Original air date: November 8, 1963

Guest appearances
- James Coburn: French; John Anderson: Goldsmith; Josie Lloyd; John Craven; John Marley: Jason

Episode chronology
← Previous "Living Doll"	Next → "Uncle Simon"
- The Twilight Zone (1959 TV series) (season 5)

"The Old Man in the Cave" is the 127th episode of the American television anthology series The Twilight Zone. It is set in a post-apocalyptic 1974, ten years after a nuclear holocaust in the United States. The episode is a cautionary tale about humanity's greed and the danger of questioning one's faith in forces greater than oneself.

== Opening narration ==
What you're looking at is a legacy that man left to himself. A decade previous he pushed his buttons and a nightmarish moment later woke up to find that he had set the clock back a thousand years. His engines, his medicines, his science were buried in a mass tomb, covered over by the biggest gravedigger of them all—a bomb. And this is the earth 10 years later, a fragment of what was once a whole, a remnant of what was once a race. The year is 1974 and this - is The Twilight Zone.

== Plot ==
In a sparsely populated town in 1974, ten years after a nuclear war had devastated the US, the townspeople have discovered a supply of canned food. However, they are waiting for Mr. Goldsmith, the town's leader, to return with a message from the mysterious and unseen "old man in the cave" who will tell them whether the food is contaminated with radiation. Some of the townsfolk want to take their chances and eat the food, but they refrain from doing so after seeing the disastrous harvest yielded when they failed to take the old man's advice about which farming areas were contaminated. When Mr. Goldsmith returns, he informs them that the old man has declared the food is contaminated and that it should be destroyed.

Shortly thereafter, three soldiers led by Major French enter the town and clash with Goldsmith as they try to establish their authority. The soldiers may or may not be representatives of the US government; Goldsmith claims that wandering packs of self-styled military men have previously intruded on the town and tried to establish authority—all unsuccessfully. French, meanwhile, reveals that there are maybe 500 people left alive between Buffalo, New York and Atlanta, Georgia, and also talks of small, isolated primitive societies on the shores of Lake Erie and in "what used to be" Chicago. He claims his job is to organize the region so that society can be rebuilt. However, Goldsmith believes that French and his men simply want to strip the town of its food.

A clash of wills ensues, and, frustrated by Goldsmith's quiet and steadfast refusal to bend, French tries to dispel the townspeople's strange beliefs about the seemingly infallible old man in the cave and take control of the area. French tempts the townspeople with some of the food Goldsmith claimed was contaminated, and many throw caution to the wind and partake. Everyone except Goldsmith eventually consumes the food and drink, and Goldsmith falls into disfavor among the townspeople. After being bullied and threatened with his life, Goldsmith finally opens the cave door, and it is ultimately revealed that in reality, the townsfolk have been using information from a computer the whole time. French rallies the townspeople into a frothing frenzy to destroy the machine, after which French leads the people into celebrating their newfound freedom from this "tyranny." However, as Goldsmith had insisted, the "old man" was correct; without an authority figure to tell them which foods are safe, the entire human population of the town, including French and the soldiers, die—except for the lone survivor, Goldsmith, who somberly walks out of the now dead town.

== Closing narration ==
Mr. Goldsmith, survivor. An eyewitness to man's imperfection. An observer of the very human trait of greed. And a chronicler of the last chapter—the one reading "suicide". Not a prediction of what is to be, just a projection of what could be. This has been - The Twilight Zone.

== Cast ==
- James Coburn as French
- John Anderson as Goldsmith
- Josie Lloyd as Evie, townswoman who says, "We already took chances. The old man told us not to plant on the north acreage."
- John Craven as townsman who asks, "Been to the cave, Jason?"
- John Marley as Jason

Uncredited (in order of appearance):

- Natalie Masters as townswoman who asks,"Did you see Goldsmith? Did he talk to the old man?"
- Don Wilbanks as Furman, one of the three soldiers with Major French, "That last part, put it on top... No trouble."

This was the last of John Anderson's four appearances on the original series. The first was as Angel Gabriel in "A Passage for Trumpet" (May 1960), the second was as the airplane captain in "The Odyssey of Flight 33" (February 1961) and the third was as Deitrich, the businessman with a conscience, who is bankrupted by the ruthless tycoon Feathersmith in "Of Late I Think of Cliffordville" (April 1963). The other cast member who appeared in more than one episode was John Marley who played the superintendent of the old-age home in "Kick the Can" (February 1962).

== Episode notes ==
Film critic Andrew Sarris noted in his review of "Time Enough at Last" that, at the time The Twilight Zone was produced, depicting an atom bomb explosion or its aftermath on network television would likely have been prohibited if it had been "couched in a more realistic format". Hence, in both this episode and "The Shelter", Serling makes a point of noting that the story is intended to be fictional, particularly given both are set in the United States.

== Bibliography ==
- DeVoe, Bill. (2008). Trivia from The Twilight Zone. Albany, GA: Bear Manor Media. ISBN 978-1-59393-136-0
- Grams, Martin. (2008). The Twilight Zone: Unlocking the Door to a Television Classic. Churchville, MD: OTR Publishing. ISBN 978-0-9703310-9-0
