= Herb Andress =

Austrian actor

- Publicity Photo of Herb Andress
- Born: Herbert Andreas Greunz; January 10, 1935; Bad Goisern, Austria
- Died: April 8, 2004 (aged 69); Munich, Bavaria, Germany

Herb Andress (January 10, 1935, in Bad Goisern – April 8, 2004, in Munich), born Herbert Andreas Greunz, was an Austrian film and television actor, known particularly for his roles in the Rainer Werner Fassbinder film Lili Marleen (1981) and the same director's TV series Eight Hours Don't Make a Day (1972).

Herb Andress later played in the television series Monaco Franze, Tatort, and Polizeiruf 110. Herb Andress died of cancer at the age of 69.

== Selected filmography ==
- Every Day Has Its Secret (1958) - Minor Role (uncredited)
- Combat! (1964-1966, TV Series) - German Lieutenant / German #2
- My Favorite Martian (1965-1966, TV Series) - Assistant / Mechanical Man
- The Ghost in the Invisible Bikini (1966) - Statue (uncredited)
- Movie Star, American Style or; LSD, I Hate You (1966) - Venda
- What Did You Do in the War, Daddy? (1966) - German Lieutenant (uncredited)
- The Battle of the Damned (1969) - German Pilot
- Rangers: attacco ora X (1970) - SS Officer
- Churchill's Leopards (1970) - Royal Marine
- Beware of a Holy Whore (1971) - Mark, Coach
- The Last Rebel (1971) - Lieutenant
- Lady Frankenstein (1971) - Hunchback (uncredited)
- The Big Bust-Out (1972) - Little Ivan
- Eight Hours Don't Make a Day (1972-1973, TV Mini-Series) - Rüdiger
- Who? (1974) - FBI Agent
- Ordine firmato in bianco (1974) - Michel Werther
- Delitto d'autore (1974)
- As of Tomorrow (1976) - Assistant to the Director (uncredited)
- Casanova & Co. (1977) - Nobleman (uncredited)
- The Expulsion from Paradise (1977) - Andy Paulisch
- Die Totenschmecker (1979) - Kurt
- Der Durchdreher (1979) - Ameriakner
- Purity of Heart (1980)
- Lili Marleen (1981) - Reintgen
- Be Gentle, Penguin (1982)
- Woman with the Red Hat (1982) - Director
- Red Heat (1985) - Werner
- Enemy Mine (1985) - Hopper
- Hell Hunters (1987) - Johann
- The Venus Trap (1988)
- Gardemarines-III (1992) - Frederick the Great
- Brennendes Herz (1996)
- Fähre in den Tod (1996, TV Movie) - Eriksen
- Lo strano caso del signor Kappa (2001) - Avvocato Uldi
- Der kleine Mann (2001) - Stromberg
- She, Me & Her (2002) - Rudi
- Taxi für eine Leiche (2002) - Ingenieur
- Luther (2003) - Gunter
- Baltic Storm (2003) - Juri Roos
