= Hell Hunters =

1988 film

- Directed by: Ernst R. von Theumer
- Written by: James Dalessandro; Louis LaRusso II
- Story by: Ernst R. von Theumer
- Produced by: Ernst R. von Theumer
- Starring: Maud Adams; Stewart Granger; Candice Daly; Rômulo Arantes; Russ McCubbin; George Lazenby; Eduardo Conde; William Berger; Herb Andress
- Cinematography: Mario DiLeo; Barry Samson
- Edited by: David E. Blewitt
- Music by: Larry Fallon
- Production companies: International Screen; TAT Filmproduktion
- Distributed by: EuroVideo (Germany); Malo Video (Canada); New World Video (United States)
- Release date: February 1988 (Germany)
- Running time: 98 minutes (US version)
- Countries: West Germany; United States
- Language: English

Hell Hunters is a 1988 horror film produced and directed by Ernst R. von Theumer, and starring Maud Adams, George Lazenby and Stewart Granger.

== Plot ==
A Nazi war criminal mad scientist creates a spider serum which turns people into Nazi zombies. A team of investigators that have devoted their lives hunting Nazi war criminals endeavor to stop him.

== Cast ==
- Maud Adams as Amanda
- Stewart Granger as Martin Hoffmann
- Candice Daly as Ally
- Rômulo Arantes as Tonio
- Russ McCubbin as Kong
- George Lazenby as Heinrich
- Eduardo Conde as El Pasado
- William Berger as Karl
- Herb Andress as Johann

== Release ==
=== Home media ===
It was announced on June 1, 2016, that Film Chest would be releasing the film for the first time on DVD later that year. The DVD included a fully restored HD version of the film taken from its original 35mm print. Film Chest released the film on DVD on July 5, 2016.
