= Hell of Borneo =

From Hell to Borneo
- US film poster
- Directed by: George Montgomery
- Written by: Ferde Grofé Jr. George Montgomery
- Produced by: George Montgomery
- Starring: George Montgomery; Torin Thatcher
- Cinematography: Emmanuel I. Rojas
- Edited by: Kenneth G. Crane
- Music by: Gene Kauer; Douglas M. Lackey
- Distributed by: American International Pictures (US)
- Release date: 1964
- Running time: 96 minutes
- Country: Philippines
- Language: English

Hell of Borneo also known as Hell to Borneo and From Hell to Borneo is a 1964 English language Philippine film produced by and starring Torin Thatcher, Vic Diaz and George Montgomery (who also directed and co-wrote the screenplay). The film does not take place in Borneo.

== Plot ==
The Island of El Dorado lies between the Philippines and Borneo and is under the jurisdiction of neither. The ownership of the island was granted to an American soldier of fortune named Dirkson after the First World War by the Royal house of Sulu. The ownership of the diversified plantation island would be perpetually owned and ruled by the Dirkson family in a manner similar to the British Brooke family, who founded and ruled the Raj of Sarawak.

An international financier named Bellflower (Torin Thatcher) and an Indonesian Prince Ali Akeem (Vic Diaz) seek El Dorado for themselves, with the former offering large amounts of money to the current owner James Dirkson (George Montgomery's real life brother Jim Montgomery), whilst the latter wishes to seize the island using an army of guerillas and pirates. When the insurgents murder James Dirkson, his brother John, a tough disreputable soldier of fortune (George Montgomery) avenges the murder of his brother and defends his own private island. He also is pursued romantically by Bellflower's daughter Marjorie (Julie Gregg) and Maria Vargas, the nurse running El Dorado's infirmary.

== Cast ==
- George Montgomery as John Dirkson
- Julie Gregg as Marjorie Bellflower
- Torin Thatcher as Mr. Bellflower
- Liza Moreno as Maria Vargas
- Vic Diaz as Prince Ali Akeem
- Joe Sison as Hoheit Ali
- Jim Montgomery as James Dirkson
