= Russ McCubbin =

American actor and stunt man (1935–2018)

- Russ McCubbin in Magnum P.I. 1986
- Born: January 16, 1935; Charleston, West Virginia, U.S.
- Died: June 28, 2018 (aged 83)

Julian Russell McCubbin (January 16, 1935 – June 28, 2018) was an American television and film actor and stunt man. He is best known for his work on Sudden Impact (1983) and High Plains Drifter (1973).

== Early life ==
As a teenager, he excelled in sports at Charleston High School. At Hargrave Military Academy, he was captain of the football and track teams, earning him athletic scholarships at numerous colleges and universities. He chose to accept an offer from Virginia Tech. Volunteering for the draft in 1954, he spent the next three years in the United States Army and was honorably discharged in 1957. After leaving the service, he hitchhiked his way across country to California to become an actor.

== Filmography ==
Title	Year	Role	Notes
Warlock	1959	Gang Member	Uncredited
The FBI Story	1959	Ku Klux Klan Member / Man Sitting In Diner	Uncredited
Waco	1966	Drover	
Three Guns for Texas	1968	Howie Walker	Uncredited
The Angry Breed	1968	Biker Co-Leader	
Cain's Cutthroats	1970	Crawford	
Myra Breckinridge	1970	Leticia's Driver	Uncredited
Hacksaw	1971	Dusty Trent	
High Plains Drifter	1973	Fred Short	
Santee	1973	Rafe	
Cheaper to Keep Her	1981	Man On Toilet	
Any Which Way You Can	1980	Cop	Uncredited
Sudden Impact	1983	Eddie	
Hell Hunters	1988	Kong	
Another 48 Hrs.	1990	Doorman	
Correct Change	2002	Stan Jenson	

== Selected Television Appearances ==
(1962) Dennis the Menace (Season 3 Episode 37: "Community Picnic") as Tiny Hawkins (1963) Gunsmoke (Season 8 Episode 19: "Cotter’s Girl") as Stage Passenger (uncredited) (1979) The Dukes of Hazzard (Season 2 Episode 6: "The Ghost of General Lee") as Phil
