= Torin Thatcher =

British actor (1905–1981)

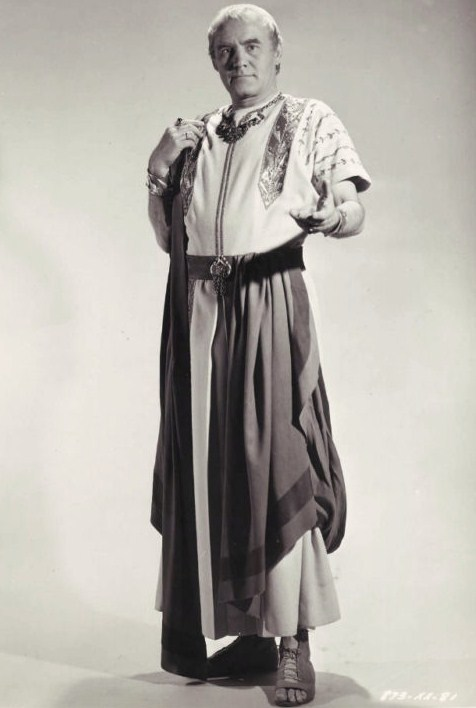
- Thatcher in The Robe (1953)
- Born: Torin Herbert Erskine Thatcher; 15 January 1905; Bombay, British India
- Died: 4 March 1981 (aged 76); Thousand Oaks, California, U.S.
- Years active: 1927–1979
- Spouses: Marguerite Mildred Daniel (m. 1940; died 1951) Anna Le Borgne (m. 1952)
- Children: 1

Torin Herbert Erskine Thatcher (15 January 1905 – 4 March 1981) was a British actor who was noted for his flashy portrayals of screen villains.

== Personal life ==
Thatcher was born 15 January 1905 in Bombay, British India, to British parents, Torin James Blair Thatcher, a police officer, and his wife Edith Rachel, a voice and piano teacher, younger daughter of the Hon. Justice Sir Herbert Batty, a puisne judge of the High Court of Bombay.

== Death ==
Thatcher died of cancer on 4 March 1981 in Thousand Oaks, California.

== Select filmography ==
- The Merchant of Venice (1927, Short) - Solanio
- Red Wagon (1933) - Minor role (uncredited)
- Irish Hearts (1934) - Dr. Hackey
- School for Stars (1935) - Guy Mannering
- The Common Round (1936, Short) - Martin
- The Man Who Could Work Miracles (1936) - Observer
- Crime Over London (1936) - Mr. Finley (uncredited)
- Sabotage (1936) - Yunct (uncredited)
- Well Done, Henry (1936) - George Canford
- Dark Journey (1937) - Strasser (uncredited)
- The School for Scandal (1937, TV Movie)
- Knight Without Armor (1937) - British Passport Official (uncredited)
- Return of the Scarlet Pimpernel (1937) - Minor role (uncredited)
- Young and Innocent (1937) - Nobby's Lodging House Caretaker (uncredited)
- Broadway (1938, TV Movie)
- Climbing High (1938) - Jim Castle
- Too Dangerous to Live (1939) - Burton
- The Day Is Gone (1939, TV Movie) - Ernest Webb
- The Spy in Black (1939) - Submarine Officer
- Old Mother Riley, MP (1939) - Jack Nelson
- The Lion Has Wings (1939) - Seaman Receiving Information About German Activity
- The Kindled Flame (1939, Short)
- Contraband (1940) - Sailor (uncredited)
- Law and Disorder (1940)
- Let George Do It! (1940) - U-Boat Commander
- Night Train to Munich (1940) - Minor Role (uncredited)
- The Case of the Frightened Lady (1940) - Jim Tilling (uncredited)
- Saloon Bar (1940) - Mr. Garrod (uncredited)
- Gasbags (1941) - SS Man
- Major Barbara (1941) - Todger Fairmile
- Saboteur (1942) - Man (uncredited)
- The Next of Kin (1942) - German General
- The Captive Heart (1946) - German officer at Medical Commission (uncredited)
- I See a Dark Stranger (1946) - Police Constable
- Great Expectations (1946) - Bentley Drummle
- The Man Within (1947) - Jailer
- Jassy (1947) - Bob Wicks
- When the Bough Breaks (1947) - Adams
- The End of the River (1947) - Lisboa
- The Fallen Idol (1948) - Policeman
- Bonnie Prince Charlie (1948) - Colonel Kor
- Now Barabbas (1949) (uncredited)
- The Black Rose (1950) - Harry (uncredited)
- Affair in Trinidad (1952) - Inspector Smythe
- The Crimson Pirate (1952) - Humble Bellows
- The Snows of Kilimanjaro (1952) - Johnson
- Blackbeard the Pirate (1952) - Sir Henry Morgan
- The Desert Rats (1953) - Colonel Barney White
- Houdini (1953) - Otto
- The Robe (1953) - Senator Gallio
- Knock on Wood (1954) - Godfrey Langston
- The Black Shield of Falworth (1954) - Sir James
- Bengal Brigade (1954) - Colonel Morrow
- Love Is a Many-Splendored Thing (1955) - Humphrey Palmer-Jones
- Lady Godiva of Coventry (1955) - Lord Godwin
- Diane (1956) - Louis - Count de Breze
- Helen of Troy (1956) - Ulysses
- Istanbul (1957) - Douglas Fielding
- Band of Angels (1957) - Captain Canavan
- Alfred Hitchcock Presents (TV) (1957) (Season 2 Episode 32: "The Hands of Mr Ottermole") - Constable Johnson
- Witness for the Prosecution (1957) - Mr. Myers
- Darby's Rangers (1958) - Sergeant McTavish
- The 7th Voyage of Sinbad (1958) - Sokurah the Magician
- Alfred Hitchcock Presents (TV) (1959) (Season 4 Episode 21: "Relative Value") - Felix Edward Manbridge
- The Miracle (1959) - The Duke of Wellington
- One Step Beyond - Doomsday (TV) - Season 2, Episode 4, October 13, 1959 - Earl of Culdane
- ’’ Wagon Train’’. (1960) - Campden
- The Canadians (1961) - Sergeant McGregor
- Thriller (TV) (1961) (Series 1, Episode 23: “Well of Doom”) - Jeremy Teal
- Jack the Giant Killer (1962) - Pendragon
- Mutiny on the Bounty (1962) - Staines (uncredited)
- Drums of Africa (1963) - Jack Cuortemayn
- Hazel- Season 2, Episode 28 (1963) - Sir Horace
- Decision at Midnight (1963) - Southstream
- The Alfred Hitchcock Hour (1964) (Season 2 Episode 29: "Bed of Roses") - Alva Hardwicke
- From Hell to Borneo (1964) - Mr. Bellflower
- The Sandpiper (1965) - Judge Thompson
- Hawaii (1966) - Reverend Dr. Thorn
- The Sweet and the Bitter (1967) - Duncan MacRoy
- The King's Pirate (1967) - Captain Cullen
- Star Trek, The Return of The Archons (1967, tv) - Marplon
- The Strange Case of Dr. Jekyll and Mr. Hyde (1968, TV Movie) - Sir John Turnbull
