= Josie Lloyd =

American actress (1940–2020)

- Lloyd on Dr. Kildare, 1963
- Born: Susanna Josephine Lloyd; May 28, 1940; New York City, U.S.
- Died: August 30, 2020 (aged 80)
- Occupation: Actress
- Years active: 1959–1967
- Spouses: Michael Gruen (m. 1965; div. 1973); Bil Baird (m. 1974; died 1987)
- Parents: Norman Lloyd (father); Peggy Craven (mother)

Susanna Josephine Lloyd (May 28, 1940 – August 30, 2020), credited professionally as Josie Lloyd, was an American actress. She was the daughter of Norman Lloyd and Peggy Lloyd, who was also an accomplished Broadway actress and director. Lloyd had roles on The Andy Griffith Show, including her 1962 and 1965 portrayals of the eccentric character Lydia Crosswaithe. Lloyd was the fourth wife of puppeteer Bil Baird, who was 36 years her senior. They were married in 1974 and remained together until Baird's death in 1987.

== Career on television ==
As a teenager in Los Angeles, California, in the late 1950s, Josie Lloyd gained on-set experience in television production by observing her father's acting and directorial work on Alfred Hitchcock Presents. On that series in 1959 she performed her first speaking role on television in the episode "Graduating Class," which was directed by Herschel Daugherty and involved her father as associate producer. Lloyd portrays Vera Carson.

The year after her role in "Graduating Class,” Lloyd had a brief uncredited performance as a girl at a New Year's Eve party in the film Studs Lonigan. She then returned to television, where between 1960 and 1967 she worked on a variety of series. She had two additional roles on Alfred Hitchcock Presents, as well as multiple performances on Dr. Kildare, The Alfred Hitchcock Hour (1964 episode "Body in the Barn"), The Farmer's Daughter, and The Andy Griffith Show.

Additional television series in which Lloyd can be seen in both dramatic and comedic roles include This Man Dawson, Channing, Have Gun – Will Travel, The Twilight Zone (1963 episode "The Old Man in the Cave"), My Three Sons, Route 66, The Long Hot Summer, and Occasional Wife. Her last known television role was "Miss Efficiency" on Occasional Wife in 1967.

== Lloyd's role as Lydia Crosswaithe ==
Josie Lloyd, between 1961 and 1965, appeared in four episodes of The Andy Griffith Show: on two occasions in 1961 in the role of Mayor Pike's daughter as both Josephine in “The Beauty Contest” and as Juanita in “Mayberry Goes Hollywood;” and in two other episodes in her most memorable role, the wallflowerish Lydia Crosswaithe. In 1962, she was cast for the first time as the odd, socially inept Lydia in "Barney Mends a Broken Heart.” Lloyd returned as the same character three years later in "Goober and the Art of Love,” which originally aired on February 1, 1965. In the 1962 episode, Lydia is a prospective date for Sheriff Andy Taylor arranged by his ever-meddlesome deputy, Barney Fife (Don Knotts), and Barney's girlfriend Thelma Lou (Betty Lynn). Lydia is again a social date in the noted 1965 episode, yet on this second occasion she is paired with the town's kind but bumbling gas-station attendant Goober Pyle (George Lindsey).

== Death ==
At age 80, Lloyd predeceased her 106-year-old father, Norman Lloyd, by nine months. Her death was not publicly reported until May 2021, when it was briefly mentioned in her father's obituary in The Washington Post.

== Selected filmography ==
- Alfred Hitchcock Presents (1959) (Season 4 Episode 28: "The Impossible Dream") as Young Lover in car (credited as Suzy Lloyd)
- Alfred Hitchcock Presents (1959) (Season 5 Episode 14: "Graduating Class") as Vera Carson
- Alfred Hitchcock Presents (1961) (Season 6 Episode 35: "Coming Home") as Bank Teller
- Alfred Hitchcock Presents (1962) (Season 7 Episode 21: "Burglar Proof") as Dorothy
- The Alfred Hitchcock Hour (1963) (Season 1 Episode 24: "The Star Juror") as Pauline Davies
- The Twilight Zone (1963) (Season 5 Episode 7: "The Old Man in the Cave") as Evie
- The Alfred Hitchcock Hour (1964) (Season 2 Episode 32: "Body in the Barn") as Nora
- The Alfred Hitchcock Hour (1965) (Season 3 Episode 24: "Power of Attorney") as Eileen Carroll
