= Maud Adams =

Swedish actress (born 1945)

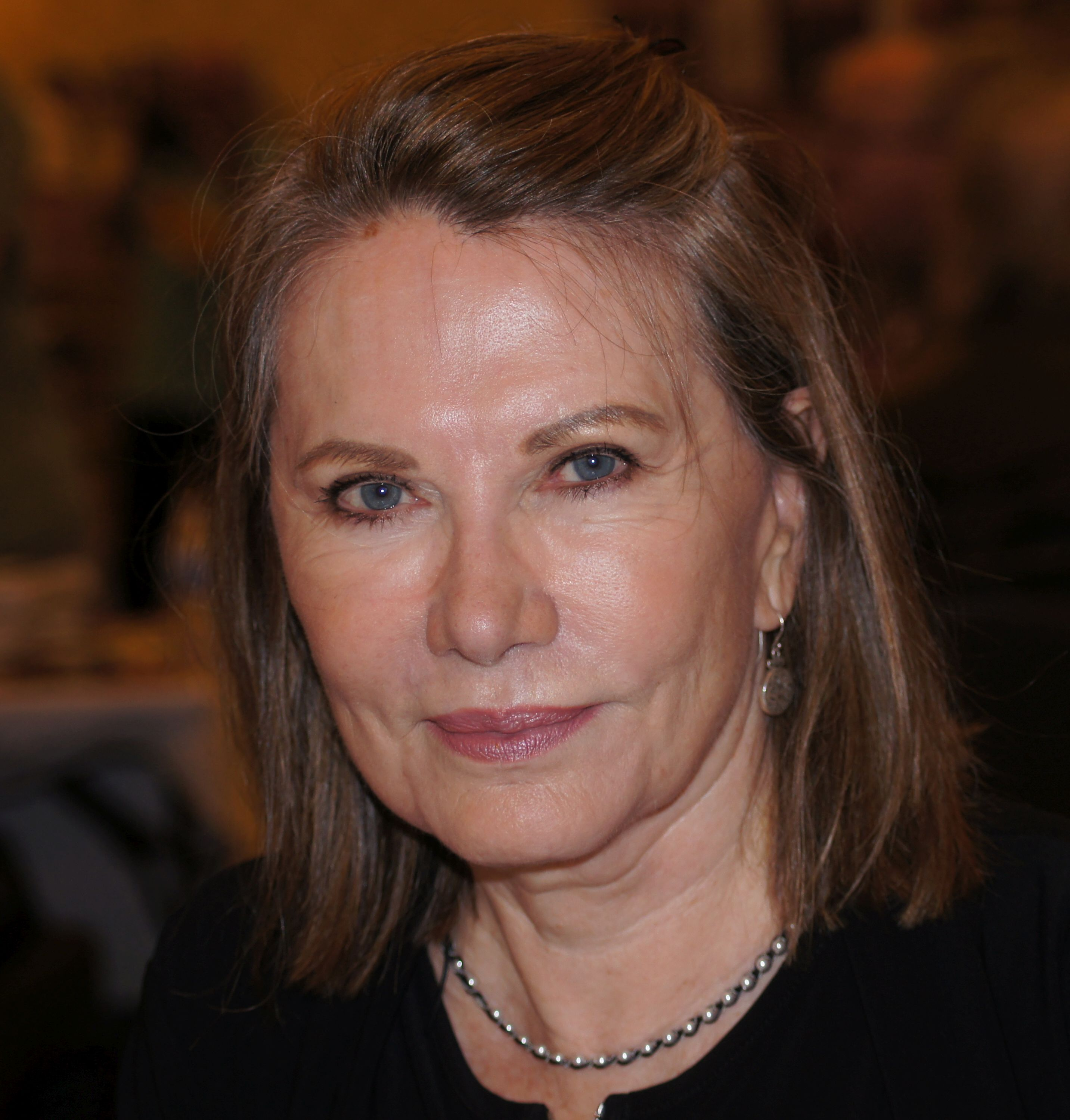
- Adams in 2019
- Born: Maud Solveig Christina Wikström; 12 February 1945 (age 81); Luleå, Sweden
- Occupations: Actress; model
- Years active: 1970–present (occasionally since 2010)
- Spouses: Roy Adams (m. 1966; div. 1975); Charles Rubin (m. 1999)

Maud Solveig Christina Adams (née Wikström; born 12 February 1945) is a Swedish actress and model, best known for her roles as two different Bond girls, first in The Man with the Golden Gun (1974) and then as the title character in Octopussy (1983).

She made many other appearances in both films and television including The Christian Licorice Store (1971), Rollerball (1975), Killer Force (1976), Merciless Man (1976), Hell Hunters (1986) and The Kill Reflex (1989).

== Early life ==
Adams was born as Maud Solveig Christina Wikström in Luleå, Sweden, the daughter of Thyra, a government tax inspector, and Gustav Wikström, a comptroller. She is fluent in five languages, and at one time wanted to work as an interpreter.

Adams was discovered in 1963 in a shop by a photographer who asked to take her picture, which he then submitted to the Miss Sweden contest arranged by the magazine Allers; from there her modelling career took off.

== Career ==
Adams moved to Paris and later to New York City to work for Eileen Ford. Her acting career started when she was asked to appear in the 1970 movie The Boys in the Band, in which she played a photo-shoot model in the opening credits. During the 1970s she guest-starred in such American TV series as Hawaii Five-O and Kojak.

Adams was catapulted to international fame when she appeared as the mistress of the villain Francisco Scaramanga in the 1974 James Bond film The Man with the Golden Gun. In short order she appeared in Norman Jewison's futuristic Rollerball (1975) and several European films, and in 1981 she starred in the thriller Tattoo. She was so well regarded by Albert Broccoli, the producer of the James Bond films, that she was asked to return to the series in 1983 for Octopussy. In this film, she plays the mysterious smuggler Octopussy, again opposite Roger Moore. Looking back on her two roles in Bond films, Adams said, "How can you not really enjoy the fact that you were a Bond Girl? It's pop culture and to be part of that is very nice."

She also was the president of a cosmetics company called Scandinavian Biocosmetics.

== Filmography ==
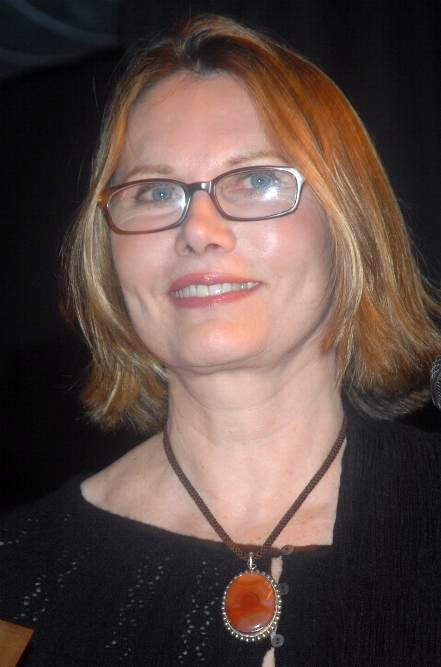
Adams in 2008

=== Films ===
Year	Title	Role	Notes
1970	The Boys in the Band	Photo Model	Uncredited
1971	The Christian Licorice Store	Cynthia	
1972	Mahoney's Last Stand	Miriam	
1973	U-Turn	Paula/Tracy	
1974	The Man with the Golden Gun	Andrea Anders	
1975	Rollerball	Ella	
1976	Killer Force	Clare Chambers	
1976	Merciless Man	Marta Mayer	
1979	Laura	Sarah	
1980	The Hostage Tower	Sabrina Carver	
1980	Playing for Time	Mala	
1981	Tattoo	Maddy	
1982	Hit Man	Carmen	
1983	Octopussy	Octopussy	
1984	Nairobi Affair	Anne Malone	
1987	The Women's Club	Angie	
1987	Jane and the Lost City	Lola Pagola	
1987	Hell Hunters	Amanda	
1988	Angel III: The Final Chapter	Nadine	
1988	Deadly Intent	Elise Marlowe	
1989	A Man of Passion	Susana	
1989	The Favorite	Sineperver	
1989	The Kill Reflex	Crystal Tarver	
1990	Initiation: Silent Night, Deadly Night 4	Fima	
1996	Ringer	Leslie Polokoff	
2008	The Seekers	Ella Swanson	

=== Television ===
Year	Title	Role	Notes
1971	Love, American Style	Melba Wilde	Episode: "Love and the Anniversary Crisis"
1977	Kojak	Elenor Martinson	2 episodes
1977	Hawaii Five-O	Maria Noble	Episode: "Deep Cover"
1978	Switch	Ava	Episode: "Stolen Island"
1978	Big Bob Johnson and His Fantastic Speed Circus	Vikki Lee Sanchez	TV film
1978	Starsky and Hutch	Kate Larrabee	Episode: "Cover Girl"
1982	Chicago Story	Dr. Judith Bergstrom	All 13 episodes
1983–1984	Emerald Point N.A.S.	Maggie Farrell	All 22 episodes
1986	Blacke's Magic	Andrea Starr	Episode: "Breathing Room"
1986	Hotel	Kay Radcliff	Episode: "Recriminations"
1988	The Mysterious Death of Nina Chéreau	Ariel Dubois	TV film
1989	Mission: Impossible	Catherine Balzac	Episode: "The Plague"
1993	A Perry Mason Mystery: The Case of the Wicked Wives	Shelly Talbot Morrison	TV film
1995–1997	Radio Shadow	Sister Katarina	6 episodes
1996	Walker, Texas Ranger	Simone Deschamps	Episode: "The Deadliest Man Alive"
1998	White Lies	Ellinor Malm	20 episodes
2000	That '70s Show	Holly	Episode: "The First Time"
2010	The Rooneys	Unknown	TV film
2024	Blood Legacy	Msizi	3 episodes

=== As director ===
- Kafé Luleå (1994) (TV series)

=== As herself ===
- Food, Wine & Friends (1979)
- Miss USA Pageant (1979) (judge)
- Women Who Rate a 10 (1981)
- Battle of the Network Stars XI (1981)
- Så ska det låta (1997) (TV episode)
- The James Bond Story (1999)
- The Men Behind the Mayhem: The Special Effects of James Bond (2000)
- Inside 'The Man with the Golden Gun' (2000)
- Inside 'Octopussy' (2000)
- Inside 'A View to a Kill' (2000)
- Bond Girls are Forever (2002) (TV)
- Premiere Bond: Die Another Day (2002)
- James Bond: A BAFTA Tribute (2002)
- Stjärnorna på slottet (2006) (5 TV episodes)
- Ann-Margret: Från Valsjöbyn till Hollywood (2014)
- From Rollerball to Rome (2020)
- For Our Eyes Only: John Glenn (2021)
