= Norman Lloyd =

American actor, producer and director (1914–2021)

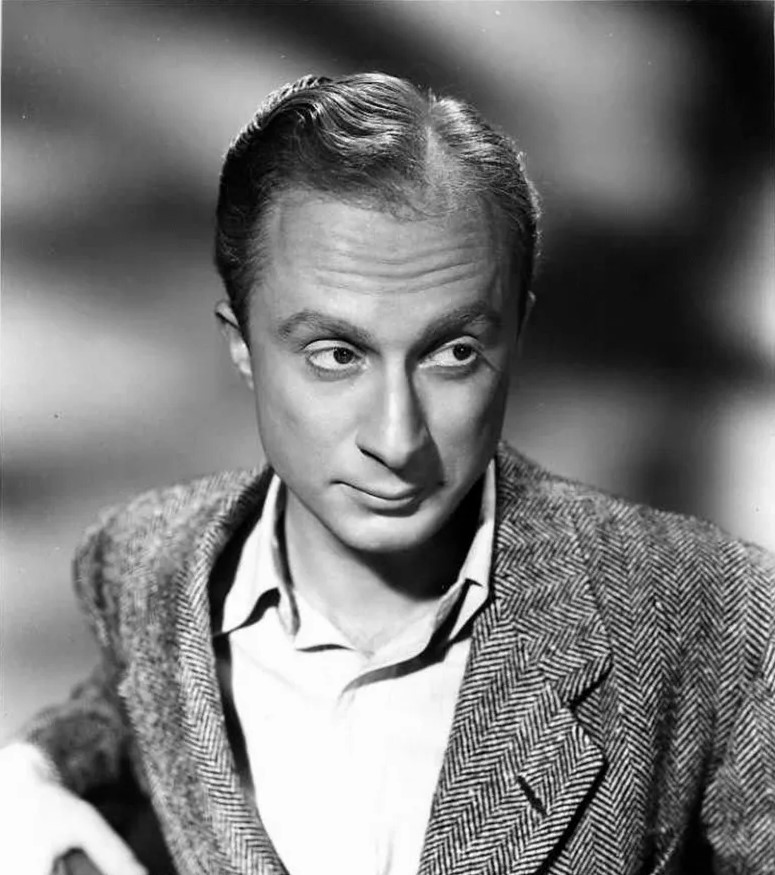
- Lloyd in 1945
- Born: Norman Nathan Perlmutter; November 8, 1914; Jersey City, New Jersey, U.S.
- Died: May 11, 2021 (aged 106); Los Angeles, California, U.S.
- Occupations: Actor; director; producer
- Years active: 1923–2020
- Spouse: Peggy Craven (m. 1936; died 2011)
- Children: 2, including Josie Lloyd

Norman Nathan Lloyd (born Perlmutter; November 8, 1914 – May 11, 2021) was an American actor, producer, and director. He worked in theatre, radio, television, and film, with a career that started in 1923 and spanned nearly a century. Lloyd's final film, Trainwreck, was released in 2015 after he turned 100. Lloyd remained the oldest-living male actor from Classic Hollywood until his death in 2021.

In the 1930s, he apprenticed with Eva Le Gallienne's Civic Repertory Theatre and worked with such influential groups as the Federal Theatre Project's Living Newspaper unit, the Mercury Theatre, and the Group Theatre. Lloyd's long professional association with Alfred Hitchcock began with his performance portraying a fifth columnist in the film Saboteur (1942). He also appeared in Spellbound (1945) and was a producer of Hitchcock's anthology television series Alfred Hitchcock Presents. Lloyd directed and produced episodic television throughout the 1950s, 1960s and 1970s. As an actor, he appeared in over 60 films and television shows, with his roles including Bodalink in Charlie Chaplin's Limelight (1952), Mr. Nolan in Dead Poets Society (1989), and Mr. Letterblair in The Age of Innocence (1993). In the 1980s, Lloyd played Dr. Daniel Auschlander, one of the starring roles on the medical drama St. Elsewhere.

== Early life and theatre ==
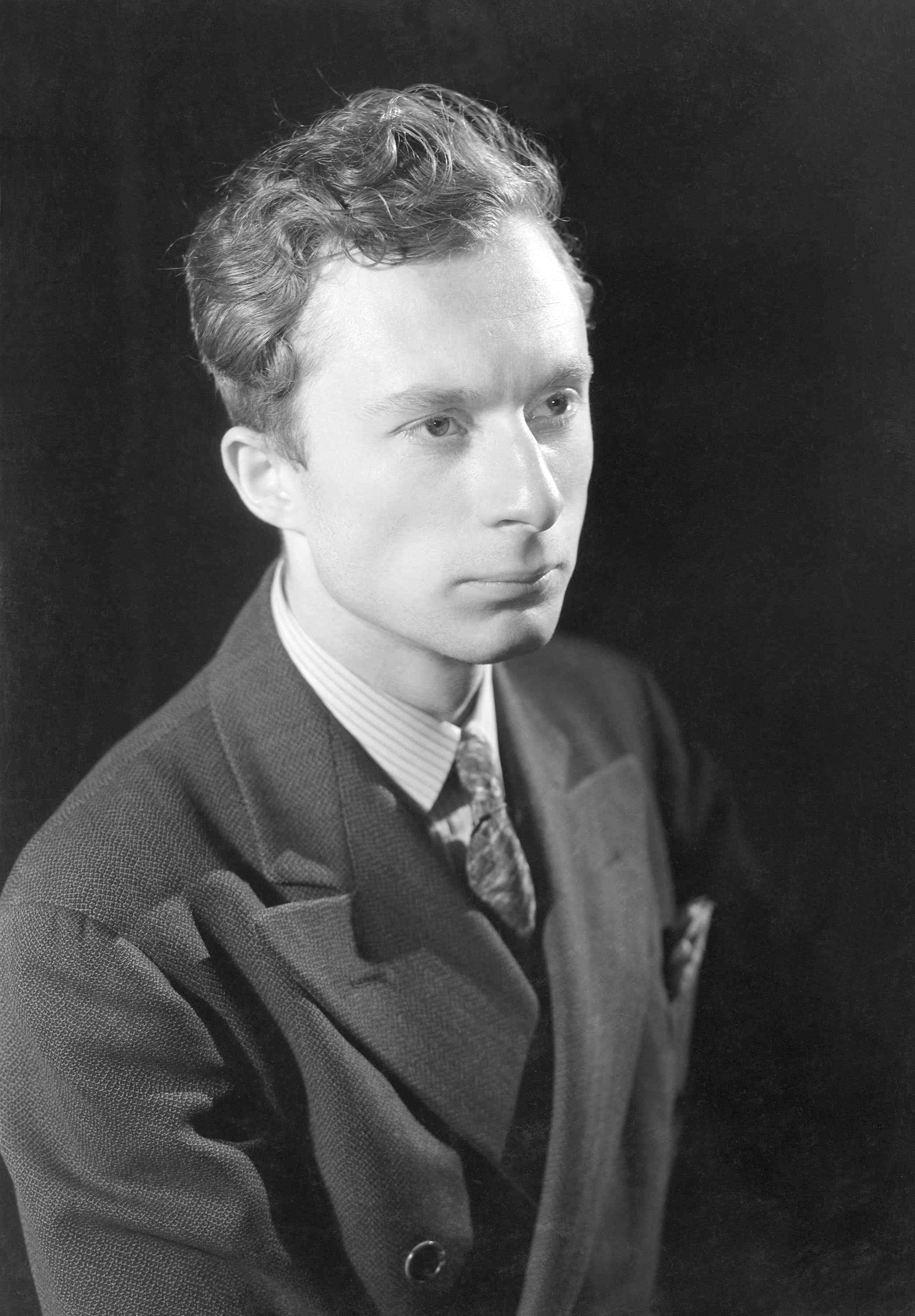
Lloyd with the Federal Theatre Project in 1937

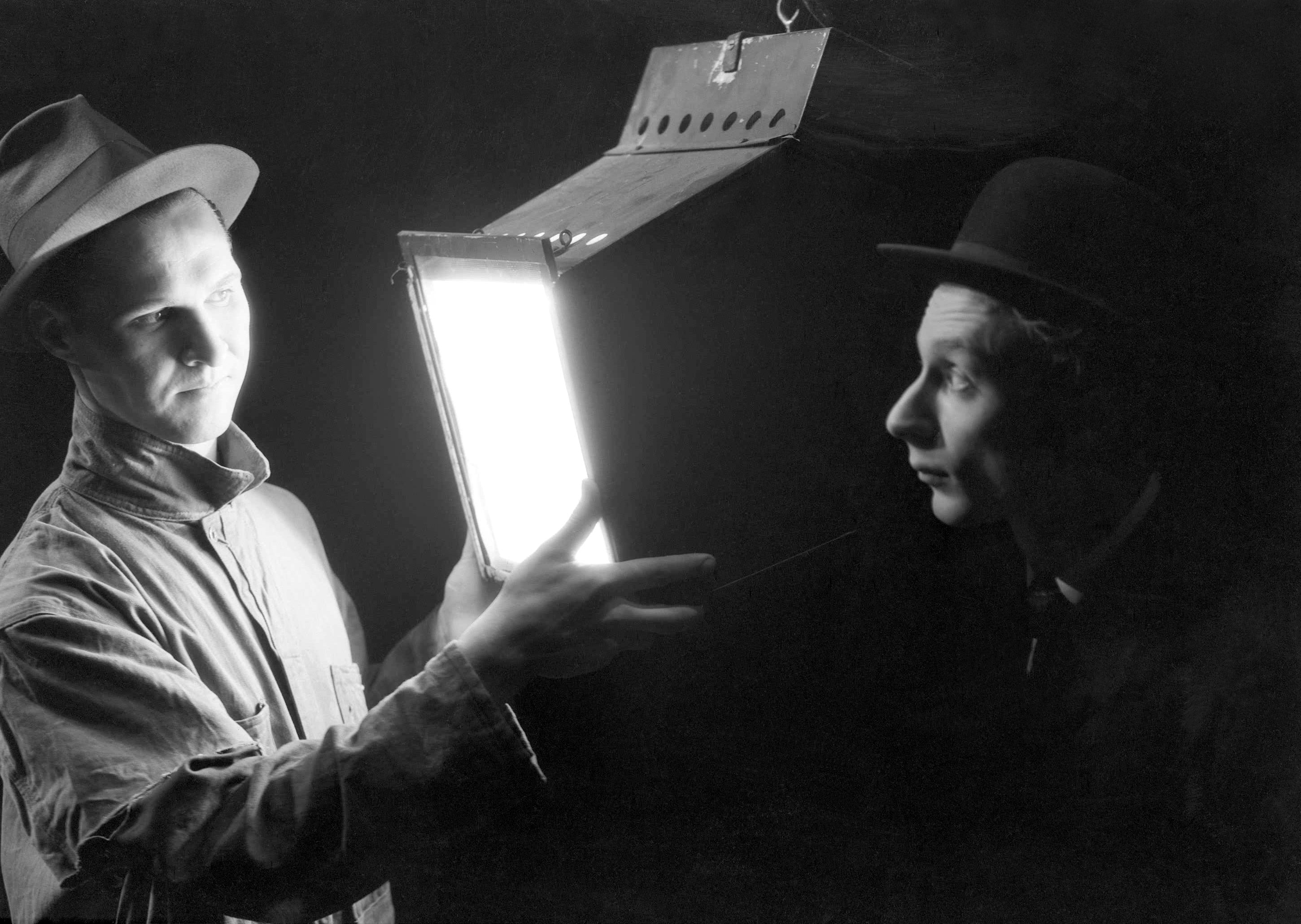
The Man Who Knows All (Robert Noack) explains the kilowatt-hour to the Consumer (Lloyd) in Power, a Living Newspaper play for the Federal Theater Project (1937)

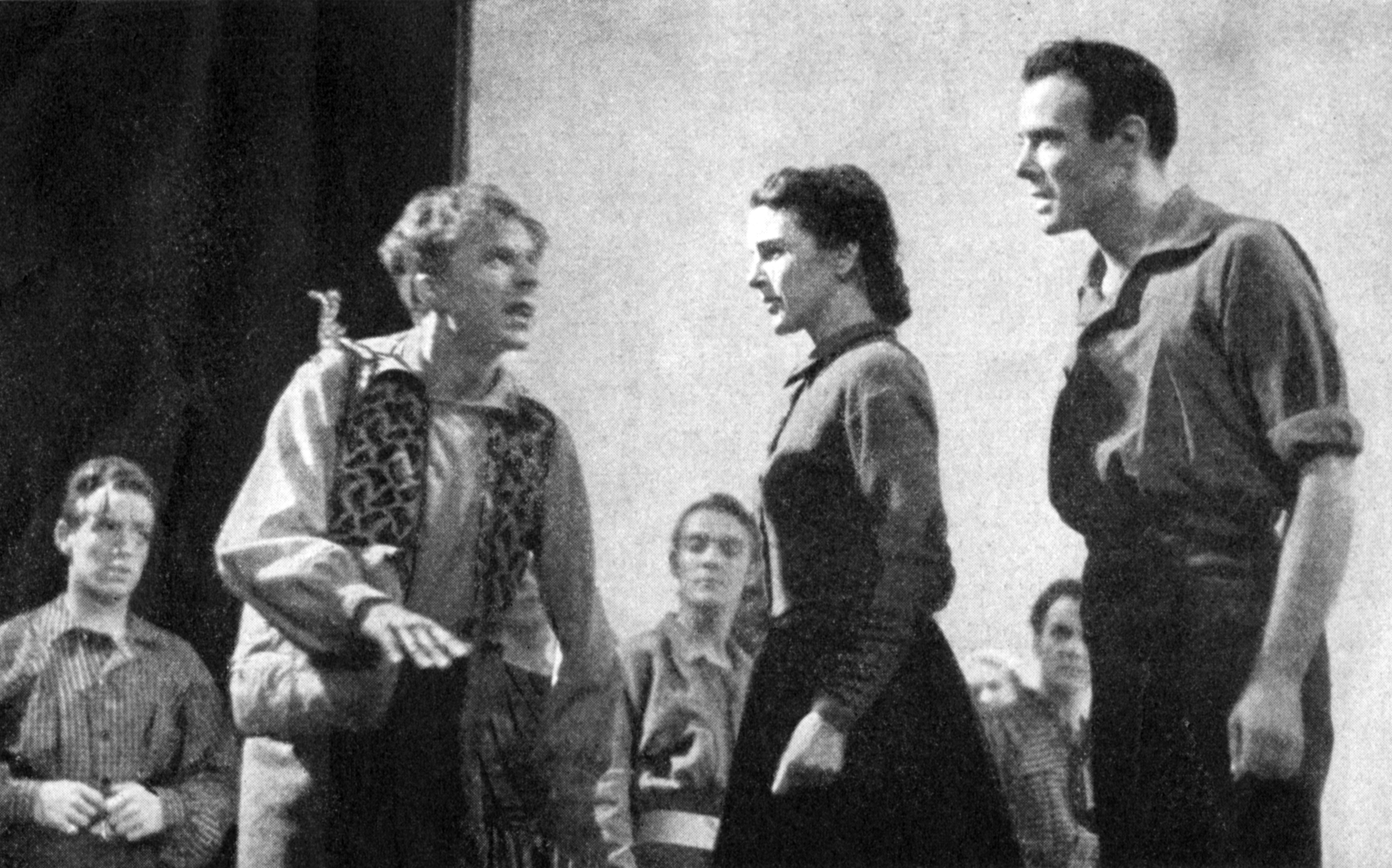
Lloyd, Katherine Emery and Dean Jagger in the Broadway production Everywhere I Roam (1938)

Lloyd was born Norman Nathan Perlmutter on November 8, 1914, in Jersey City, New Jersey. His family was Jewish and lived in New York City. His father, Max Perlmutter, was an accountant who later became a salesman and proprietor of a furniture store. His mother, Sadie Horowitz Perlmutter, was a bookkeeper and housewife. She had a good voice and a lifelong interest in the theatre, and she took her young son to singing and dancing lessons. He had two sisters, Ruth and Janice, who survived her brother by four months. Lloyd became a child performer, appearing at vaudeville benefits and women's clubs, and was a professional by the age of nine. Lloyd graduated from high school when he was 15 and began studies at New York University, but left at the end of his sophomore year. "All around me I could see the way the Depression was affecting everyone; for my family, for people in business like my father, it was a terrible time," he wrote. "I just wasn't going to stay in college, paying tuition to get a degree to be a lawyer, when I could see lawyers who had become taxi drivers." Lloyd's father died in 1945, at age 55, "broken by the world that he was living in."

In 1932, at age 17, Lloyd auditioned and became the youngest of the apprentices under the direction of May Sarton at Eva Le Gallienne's Civic Repertory Theatre in New York City. He then joined Sarton's Apprentice Theatre in New Hampshire, continuing his studies with her and her associate, Eleanor Flexner. The group rehearsed a total of ten modern European plays and performed at The New School for Social Research and in Boston. Members of the Harvard Dramatic Club saw Lloyd on stage and offered him the lead in a play directed by Joseph Losey. He rejoined Sarton's group, for whom Losey directed a Boston production of Gods of the Lightning. When Sarton was forced to give up her company, Losey suggested that Lloyd audition for a production of André Obey's Noah (1935). It was Lloyd's first Broadway show.

Through Losey, Lloyd became involved in the social theatre of the 1930s, beginning with an acting collective called The Theatre of Action. The group was preparing a production of Michael Blankfort's The Crime (1936), directed by Elia Kazan. One of the company members was Peggy Craven, who would later become Lloyd's wife.

Losey brought Lloyd into the Federal Theatre Project — which Lloyd called "one of the great theaters of all time"— and its Living Newspapers, which dramatized contemporary events. They initially prepared Ethiopia, about the Italian invasion, which was deemed too controversial and was terminated. The first completed presentation was Triple-A Plowed Under (1936), followed by Injunction Granted (1936) and Power (1937).

When Orson Welles and John Houseman left the Federal Theatre Project to form their own independent repertory theatre company, the Mercury Theatre, Lloyd was invited to become a charter member. He played a memorable role in its first stage production, Caesar (1937), Welles's modern-dress adaptation of Shakespeare's tragedy Julius Caesar — streamlined into an anti-fascist tour-de-force. In a scene that became the fulcrum of the show, Cinna the Poet (Lloyd) dies at the hands not of a mob but of a secret police force. Lloyd called it "an extraordinary scene [that] gripped the audience in a way that the show stopped for about three minutes. The audience stopped it with applause. It showed the audience what fascism was; rather than an intellectual approach, you saw a physical one."

The Mercury prepared The Shoemaker's Holiday to go into repertory with Caesar beginning in January 1938. During the December 25 performance of Caesar — when the sets, lighting, and costumes for Shoemaker were ready but no previews had been held — Welles asked the cast if they cared to present a surprise preview immediately after the show. He invited the audience to stay and watch the set changes, and the curtain rose at 1:15 a.m. Lloyd recalled it as "the wildest triumph imaginable. The show was a smash during its run — but never again did we have a performance like that one."

Lloyd performed on the first of four releases in the Mercury Text Records series, phonographic recordings of Shakespeare plays adapted for educators by Welles and Roger Hill. The Merchant of Venice features Lloyd in the roles of Salanio and Launcelot Gobbo. Released on Columbia Masterworks Records in 1939, the recording was reissued on CD in 1998.

Lloyd played the role of Johnny Appleseed in Everywhere I Roam (1938), a play by Arnold Sundgaard that was developed by the Federal Theatre Project and staged on Broadway by Marc Connelly. "It was a lovely experience, although the play failed," Lloyd recalled. "For me, it was a success; in those days, before the Tony Awards, the critics' Ten Best Performers list at the end of the year was the greatest recognition. For my performance, I was selected to be on the list by the critics."

== Films ==
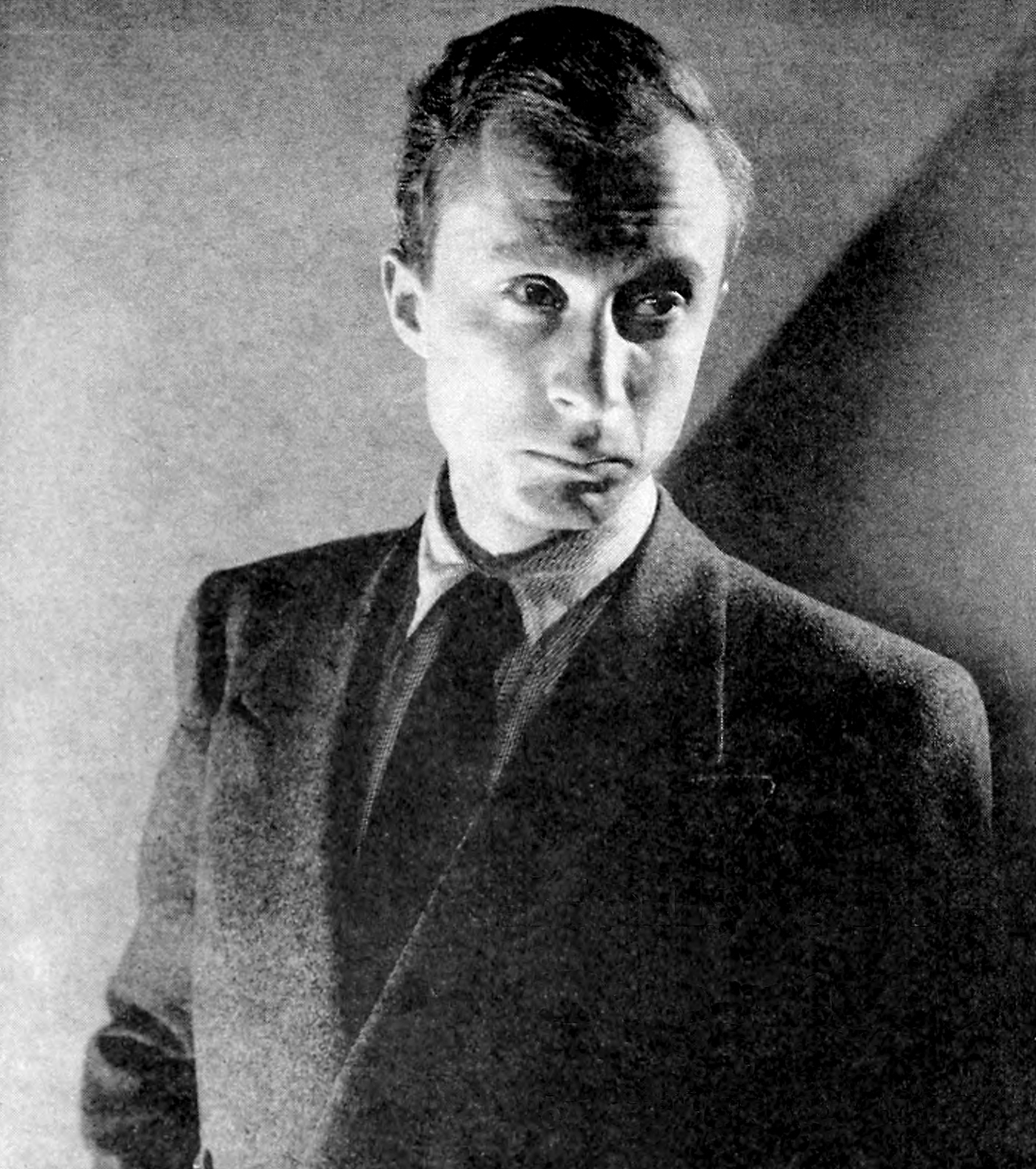
Lloyd in Saboteur (1942)

In late summer 1939, Lloyd was invited to Hollywood, to join Welles and other Mercury Theatre members in the first film being prepared for RKO Pictures — Heart of Darkness. Given a six-week guarantee at $500 a week, he took part in a reading for the film, which was to be presented entirely through a first-person camera. After elaborate pre-production the project never reached production because Welles was unable to trim $50,000 from its budget, something RKO insisted upon as its revenue was declining sharply in Europe by autumn 1939. Welles asked the actors to stay a few more weeks as he put together another film project, but Lloyd was ill-advised by a member of the radio company and impulsively returned to New York. "Those who stayed did Citizen Kane," Lloyd wrote. "I have always regretted it."

J. Carrol Naish, Zachary Scott and Lloyd in The Southerner (1945)

Lloyd later returned to Hollywood to play a Nazi spy in Alfred Hitchcock's Saboteur (1942), beginning a long friendship and professional association with Hitchcock. Three years later he was cast by French director Jean Renoir to portray the malicious, dull-witted character Finley in The Southerner, which was the fourth film of six productions that Renoir directed in the 1940s while living in the United States. After a few more villainous screen roles, Lloyd then worked behind the camera as an assistant on Lewis Milestone's Arch of Triumph (1948). A friend of John Garfield, Lloyd performed with him in the 1951 film noir crime drama He Ran All the Way, Garfield's last film before the Hollywood blacklist ended his film career.

== Post-war career ==
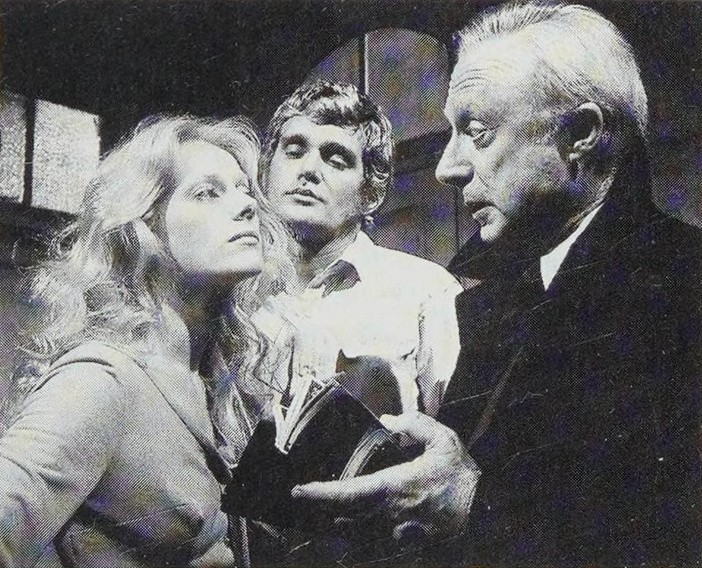
Sondra Locke, Bo Hopkins and Lloyd in Gondola (1973)

A marginal victim of the Hollywood blacklist, Lloyd was rescued professionally by Hitchcock, who had previously cast the actor in Saboteur and Spellbound (1945). Hitchcock hired Lloyd as an associate producer and a director on his television series Alfred Hitchcock Presents in 1958. Previously, Lloyd directed the sponsored film A Word to the Wives (1955) with Marsha Hunt and Darren McGavin. He continued directing and producing episodic television throughout the 1960s and 1970s. He took an unusual role in the Night Gallery episode "A Feast of Blood" as the bearer of a cursed brooch, which he inflicts upon a hapless woman, played by Sondra Locke, who had spurned his romantic advances. In FM (1978), Lloyd has a small but pivotal role as the owner of a Los Angeles radio station that is undergoing a mutiny of sorts, due to a battle over advertising. Lloyd's character (Carl Billings) ends up playing the white hat role and keeping the station as is, to the delight of staff and fans.

In the 1980s, Lloyd played Dr. Daniel Auschlander in the television drama St. Elsewhere over its six-season run (1982–88). Originally scheduled for only four episodes, Lloyd became a regular for the rest of the series. In addition to Ed Flanders and William Daniels, St. Elsewhere included a roster of relative unknowns, including Ed Begley, Jr., Denzel Washington, Stephen Furst, Eric Laneuville, David Morse, and Howie Mandel.

Lloyd's first film role in nearly a decade was in Dead Poets Society (1989), playing Mr. Nolan, the authoritarian headmaster of Welton Academy, opposite Robin Williams. Initially, Lloyd was hesitant when asked to audition, because he thought the director and producers could judge whether or not he was right for the part by watching his acting on St. Elsewhere. Director Peter Weir was living in Australia and had not seen St. Elsewhere. Lloyd agreed to audition for him after winning his daily tennis match.

From 1998 to 2001, he played Dr. Isaac Mentnor in the UPN science fiction drama Seven Days. His numerous television guest-star appearances include The Joseph Cotten Show; Murder, She Wrote; The Twilight Zone; Wiseguy; Star Trek: The Next Generation; Wings; The Practice; and Civil Wars.

He played in various radio plays for Peggy Webber's California Artists Radio Theater and Yuri Rasovsky's Hollywood Theater of the Ear. His last film role was in Trainwreck (2015) in which he acted at the age of 99, although he admitted he was slightly put off by the film's raunchy content. He is the subject of the documentary Who Is Norman Lloyd?, which premiered at the Sundance Film Festival on September 1, 2007. In 2010, he guest-starred in an episode of ABC's Modern Family. On December 5, 2010, he presented An Evening with Norman Lloyd at the Colony Theatre in Burbank, California, where he spoke about his career and answered questions from the audience.

== Personal life and death ==
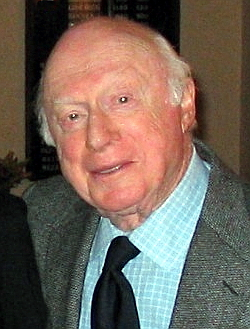
Lloyd in 2007

On June 29, 1936, Lloyd married stage actress Peggy Craven. Together, they had two children: Michael, and actress Josie, who died the year before Lloyd. Lloyd and Craven remained married for 75 years until her death in 2011. Lloyd began practicing his lifelong hobby of tennis at the age of 8. "With the application and time I have devoted to it, I should have been a reigning World Champion", he said in a 2000 interview. His opponents included Charlie Chaplin, Joseph Cotten, and Spencer Tracy. Lloyd continued to play twice a week until July 2015, when he had a fall. He stopped driving in 2014 at Michael's insistence.

Lloyd turned 100 on November 8, 2014. Two of his longtime friends and understudies, Ed Begley Jr. and Howie Mandel (both of whom co-starred with Lloyd on St. Elsewhere), reflected on his centenarian celebration; Begley, Jr. said: "I [have] worked with Norman Lloyd the actor and Norman Lloyd the director, and no one [has] informed me better on the art of storytelling than that talented man. He is a constant inspiration, and my eternal friend"; Mandel added, "I love Norman Lloyd. He is a legend. I have spent hours like a little kid while he regaled us with stories of Hitchcock. He teaches, he entertains. He is a legend."

On October 25, 2017, two weeks before his 103rd birthday, Lloyd attended Game 2 of the 2017 World Series in Los Angeles. Ninety-one years earlier, at the age of 11, he attended Game 1 of the 1926 World Series at Yankee Stadium.

Lloyd died in his sleep at his home in the Brentwood neighborhood of Los Angeles, California, on May 11, 2021, at the age of 106.

== Cultural references ==
In Me and Orson Welles (2008), Richard Linklater's period drama set in the days surrounding the premiere of the Mercury Theatre's production of Caesar, Lloyd is portrayed by Leo Bill.

== Selected theatre credits ==
=== As actor ===
Date	Title	Role	Theatre	Notes
October 26, 1932 – 1933	Liliom	Stretcher bearer (uncredited)	Civic Repertory Theatre, New York City	Directed by Eva Le Gallienne
December 12, 1932 – 1933	Alice in Wonderland	5 of Clubs (as Mr. Lloyd)	Civic Repertory Theatre, New York City	Directed by Eva Le Gallienne
1933	A Secret Life, The Children's Tragedy, Naked, Fear, The Armored Train, The Call of Life, The Sowers	Various	The New School for Social Research, New York City	Apprentice Theatre, executive director May Sarton
1934	A Bride for the Unicorn	Jay	Harvard Dramatic Club	Directed by Joseph Losey
1935	Dr. Knock	Knock	Peabody Playhouse, Boston	Associated Actors (May Sarton)
1935	Gallery Gods		Peabody Playhouse, Boston	Associated Actors (May Sarton)
1935	Gods of the Lightning	Macready	Peabody Playhouse, Boston	Associated Actors (May Sarton); directed by Joseph Losey
February 3 – March 1935	Noah	Japhet	Longacre Theatre, New York City	Broadway debut
1935	School for Wives		Peterborough Players, Peterborough, New Hampshire	Summer stock
1936	The Crime		Civic Repertory Theatre, New York City	Two nights, presented The Theatre Union; directed by Elia Kazan
March 14–May 2, 1936	Triple-A Plowed Under	Leads in vaudeville sketches	Biltmore Theatre, New York City	Living Newspaper, Federal Theatre Project; directed by Joseph Losey
July 24–October 20, 1936	Injunction Granted	Clown	Biltmore Theatre, New York City	Living Newspaper, Federal Theatre Project; directed by Joseph Losey
February 22–July 10, 1937	Power	Angus J. Buttoncooper, the Consumer	Ritz Theatre, New York City	Living Newspaper, Federal Theatre Project; directed by Brett Warren
November 11, 1937 – May 28, 1938	Caesar	Cinna the Poet	Mercury Theatre and National Theatre, New York City	Debut of the Mercury Theatre; directed by Orson Welles
January 1 – April 28, 1938	The Shoemaker's Holiday	Roger, commonly called Hodge	Mercury Theatre and National Theatre, New York City	In repertory with Caesar; directed by Orson Welles
December 29, 1938 – January 1939	Everywhere I Roam	Johnny Appleseed	National Theatre, New York City	Directed by Marc Connelly; Lloyd named to the critics' Ten Best Performers list
April 1939	Quiet City	David	Belasco Theatre, New York City	Three Sunday nights; directed by Elia Kazan for The Group Theatre
April 12 – May 11, 1940	Medicine Show		New Yorker Theatre, New York City	Commercially produced Living Newspaper on health in the U.S.
1940	Pigeons and People		Dock Street Theatre, Charleston, South Carolina	
February 5–22, 1941	Liberty Jones		Shubert Theatre, New York City	
September 3–27, 1941	Village Green		Henry Miller Theatre, New York City	
February 4–13, 1943	Ask My Friend Sandy	Sandy	Biltmore Theatre, New York City	
December 25, 1950 – February 3, 1951	King Lear	Fool	National Theatre, New York City	Directed by John Houseman
1954	Madame Will You Walk	Dockweil	Phoenix Theatre, New York City	
1955	Don Juan in Hell	Devil	La Jolla Playhouse, San Diego, California	
1956	Measure for Measure	Lucio	American Shakespeare Festival, Stratford, Connecticut; Phoenix Theatre, New York City	Directed by John Houseman and Jack Landau
1974	Major Barbara	Undershaft	Mark Taper Forum, Los Angeles, California	
July 1–12, 1992	The Will and Bart Show	Will	Williamstown Theatre Festival, Williamstown, Massachusetts	Written by Jim Lehrer
December 5, 2010	An Evening with Norman Lloyd	Himself	Colony Theatre, Burbank, California	

=== As director ===
Date	Title	Theatre	Notes
1951	The Cocktail Party	La Jolla Playhouse, San Diego, California	
1952	The Lady's Not for Burning	La Jolla Playhouse, San Diego, California	
1953	I Am a Camera, You Never Can Tell, Dial M for Murder, The Postman Always Rings Twice	La Jolla Playhouse, San Diego, California	
1954	Madame Will You Walk	Phoenix Theatre, New York City	Co-director with Hume Cronyn
March 11 – April 1954	The Golden Apple	Phoenix Theatre, New York City	Best Musical, New York Drama Critics Circle
1954	The Winslow Boy, Anniversary Waltz, Sabrina Fair, The Seven Year Itch, The Vacant Lot	La Jolla Playhouse, San Diego, California	
1955	The Rainmaker, Native Uprising, Billy Budd, The Time of the Cuckoo	La Jolla Playhouse, San Diego, California	
1956	The Taming of the Shrew	American Shakespeare Festival, Stratford, Connecticut; Phoenix Theatre, New York City	
1973	Carola		TV movie

== Select radio credits ==
Date	Title	Role	Notes
October 24, 1937	Columbia Workshop	Private Schnook	"I've Got the Tune", radio opera by Marc Blitzstein
July 13, 1940	The Listener's Playhouse		"No Program Tonight, or The Director's Dilemma"
June 1, 1941	Columbia Workshop		"26 by Corwin: Appointment"
July 5, 1943	Cavalcade of America		"Listen to the People"
July 12, 1943	Cavalcade of America		"Soldier of the Cloth"
July 19, 1943	Cavalcade of America		"The Schoolhouse at the Front"
August 2, 1943	Cavalcade of America	Narrator	"Nine Men Against the Arctic"
August 9, 1943	Cavalcade of America		"Shortcut to Tokyo"
August 16, 1943	Cavalcade of America		"The Major and the Mules"
August 23, 1943	Cavalcade of America		"The Weapon That Saves Lives"
September 23, 1943	Words at War		"They Shall Not Have Me"
December 13, 1943	Cavalcade of America		"Check Your Heart at Home"
December 27, 1943	Cavalcade of America		"U-Boat Prisoner"
January 3, 1944	Cavalcade of America		"Bullseye for Sammy"
February 7, 1944	Cavalcade of America		"Prologue to Glory"
February 21, 1944	Cavalcade of America		"The Purple Heart Comes to Free Meadows"
February 22, 1944	Words at War		"Assignment USA"; repeated April 4, 1944
March 21, 1944	Words at War		"Der Fuehrer"
April 26, 1944	Arthur Hopkins Presents		"Redemption"
May 24, 1945	Suspense		"My Own Murderer"
July 17, 1945	Columbia Presents Corwin	Clerk	"The Undecided Molecule", verse story by Norman Corwin

== Selected film and television credits ==
=== As actor ===
==== Film ====
Year	Title	Role	Notes
1942	Saboteur	Frank Fry	
1945	The Southerner	Finley	
1945	The Unseen	Jasper Goodwin	
1945	Spellbound	Mr. Garmes	
1945	A Walk in the Sun	Archimbeau	
1945	Within These Walls	Pete Moran	
1946	A Letter for Evie	DeWitt Pyncheon	
1946	Young Widow	Sammy	
1946	The Green Years	Adam Leckie	
1947	The Beginning or the End	Dr. Troyanski	
1948	No Minor Vices	Dr. Sturdevant	
1949	Scene of the Crime	Sleeper	
1949	The Black Book	Jean-Lambert Tallien	
1949	Calamity Jane and Sam Bass	Jim Murphy	
1950	Buccaneer's Girl	Patout	
1950	The Flame and the Arrow	Apollo, the troubadour	
1951	Flame of Stamboul	Louis Baracca	
1951	M	Sutro	
1951	He Ran All the Way	Al Molin	
1952	The Light Touch	Anton	
1952	Limelight	Bodalink	
1977	Audrey Rose	Dr. Steven Lipscomb	
1978	The Dark Secret of Harvest Home	Amrys Penrose	
1978	FM	Carl Billings	
1979	Beggarman, Thief	Roland Fielding	
1980	The Nude Bomb	Carruthers	
1981	Jaws of Satan	The Monsignore	
1989	Dead Poets Society	Headmaster Gale Nolan	
1991	Journey of Honor	Father Vasco	
1993	The Age of Innocence	Mr. Letterblair	
2000	The Adventures of Rocky and Bullwinkle	Wossamotta U. President	
2003	Charlie: The Life and Art of Charles Chaplin	Himself	Documentary
2005	In Her Shoes	The Professor	
2007	Who Is Norman Lloyd?	Himself	Documentary
2014	Magician: The Astonishing Life and Work of Orson Welles	Himself	Documentary
2014	A Place for Heroes	Older Robert	
2015	Trainwreck	Norman	Final acting role
2015	Marsha Hunt's Sweet Adversity	Himself	Documentary
2018	The Great Buster: A Celebration	Himself	Documentary
2019	Propaganda: The Art of Selling Lies	Himself	Documentary
2021	Broadway: Beyond the Golden Age	Himself	Documentary (Posthumous release)
2022	Romantic Mysticism: The Music of Billy Goldenberg	Himself	Documentary (Posthumous release)

==== Television ====
Year	Title	Role	Notes
1956	The United States Steel Hour	Francis Oberon	Episode: "We Must Kill Toni"
1956	Kraft Television Theatre	Andrew J. Fogarty1	Episode: "Paper Foxhole"
1956	Kraft Television Theatre		Episode: "The Plunge"
1957	Alfred Hitchcock Presents	Lieutenant Orsatti	Season 2 Episode 16: "Nightmare in 4D"
1957	General Electric Theater	Johnny	Episode: "The Earring"
1957	The Joseph Cotten Show: On Trial	Duke of Buckingham	Episode: "The Trial of Colonel Blood"
1958	Alfred Hitchcock Presents	Charles Brailing	Season 4 Episode 6: "Design for Loving"
1959	Alcoa Presents: One Step Beyond	Harold Stern	Episode: "Delusion"
1960	Alfred Hitchcock Presents	Narrator	Season 5 Episode 20: "The Day of the Bullet"
1960	Alfred Hitchcock Presents	The Little Man	Season 5 Episode 25: "The Little Man Who Was There"
1960	New Comedy Showcase	Hotel manager	Season 1 Episode 6: "Slezak and Son"
1961	Alfred Hitchcock Presents	Leo Thorby	Season 7 Episode 3: "Maria"
1970	The Most Deadly Game	Norman	Episode: "Nightbirds"
1972	O'Hara, U.S. Treasury		Episode: "Operation Mr. Felix"
1972	Night Gallery	Henry Mallory	Episode: "A Feast of Blood"
1972	The Scarecrow	Dickon	Television film
1973	Gondola	Lewis	Television film
1975	Kojak	Harry Fein	Episode: "Night of the Piraeus"
1976	The New Deal for Artists	Himself	Television documentary
1982	Quincy M.E.	Cornelius Sumner	Episode: "Stolen Tears"
1982–1988	St. Elsewhere	Dr. Daniel Auschlander	132 episodes
1985	The Paper Chase	Professor	Episode: "Laura's Struggle"
1986–1993	Murder, She Wrote	Edward St. Cloud / Philip Arkham / Lloyd Marcus	3 episodes
1986	The Twilight Zone	Merlin	Episode: "The Last Defender of Camelot"
1989	Wiseguy	General Leland Masters	4 episodes
1989	Amityville: The Evil Escapes	Father Manfred	Television film
1992	Civil Wars	Gordon Wimsatt	Episode: "Oceans White with Phone"
1992	Home Fires	Dr. Marcus	6 episodes
1993	Star Trek: The Next Generation	Professor Galen	Episode: "The Chase"
1995	The Omen	Aaron	Television film
1996	Wings	Lyle Bartlett	Episode: "Bye George"
1997–2003	The Practice	D. A. Asher Silverman	3 episodes
1998–2001	Seven Days	Dr. Isaac Mentnor	49 episodes
2000	Fail Safe	Defense Secretary Swenson	Television film
2001	The Song of the Lark	Madison Bowers	Television film
2010	Modern Family	Donald	Episode: "Manny Get Your Gun"
2017	Home & Family	Himself	Episode: Lauren Ash/William Daniels & Bonnie Bartlett, uncredited

=== As director, producer ===
Year	Title	Notes
1948	Arch of Triumph	Associate to the Director
1949	The Red Pony	Assistant to the Producer
1952	Chevron Theatre (TV series)	Director, "That's My Pop", "Annual Honeymoon", "The Bacular Clock", "Mungahra", "The Survey Man", "Meet the Little Woman", "The Reluctant Burglar", "One Thing Leads to Another"
1952	Gruen Playhouse (TV series)	Director, "Dream Man", "A Boy with a Gun", "Bird of Prey", "For Life"
1952	Omnibus (TV series)	Director, "Mr. Lincoln", five half-hour films
1954–1955	A Word to the Wives, The Right Touch, Room for Improvement	Director, industrial films
1957–1958	Suspicion (TV series)	Associate Producer
1957–1962	Alfred Hitchcock Presents (TV series)	Associate Producer
1958	Alfred Hitchcock Presents (TV series)	Director, "$2,000,000 Defense", "Six People, No Music", "Safety for the Witness"
1959	Alfred Hitchcock Presents (TV series)	Director, "Your Witness", "Human Interest Story", "No Pain", "Anniversary Gift". "Special Delivery", "Man from the South", "Say of the Bullet"
1960	Alfred Hitchcock Presents (TV series)	Director, "Hooked", "Very Moral Theft", "Contest for Aaron Gold", "O Youth! O Beauty!"
1961	Alfred Hitchcock Presents (TV series)	Director, "Incident in a Small Jail", "I Spy", "You Can't Be a Little Girl All Your Life", "Strange Miracle", "The Faith of Aaron Menefree"
1962–1963	Alfred Hitchcock Hour (TV series)	Producer
1962	Alfred Hitchcock Hour (TV series)	Director, "Final Vow"
1962	Alcoa Premiere (TV series)	Director, "The Jail"
1963–1965	Alfred Hitchcock Hour (TV series)	Executive Producer
1964	Alfred Hitchcock Hour (TV series)	Director, "The Jar", "The Lifework of Juan Diaz"
1968	Journey to the Unknown (TV series)	Executive Producer
1968	The Smugglers (TV)	Director, Producer
1968	Companions in Nightmare (TV)	Director, Producer
1971	Columbo (TV series)	Director, "Lady in Waiting"
1972	Carola (TV)	Director, Producer
1972–1976	Hollywood Television Theatre (TV series)	Executive Producer; Director, "Nourish the Beast", "Knuckle", "Ascent of Mount Fuji", "The Fatal Weakness", Philemon, "Actor", "The Carpenters", "Awake and Sing"
1980–1982	Tales of the Unexpected (TV series)	Producer, American episodes Director, "Youth from Vienna", "Wet Saturday"

== Accolades ==
Year	Award	Category	Work	Result	Refs
1970	Primetime Emmy Awards	Outstanding Dramatic Series	The Name of the Game	Nominated	
1974	Primetime Emmy Awards	Outstanding Special - Comedy or Drama	Steambath	Nominated	
1985	Venice Film Festival	Venice TV Prize - Special Mention	Alfred Hitchcock Presents	Won	
2020	Los Angeles Film Critics Association Awards	Legacy of Cinema	Limelight	Won	
