= Peggy Lloyd =

American stage actress and television director (1913–2011)

- Born: Margaret Hirsdansky; August 14, 1913; New York City, New York, U.S.
- Died: August 30, 2011 (aged 98); Los Angeles, California, U.S.
- Occupations: Actress, television director
- Spouse: Norman Lloyd (m. 1936)
- Children: 2, including Josie

Peggy Lloyd (formerly Craven; born Margaret Hirsdansky; August 14, 1913 – August 30, 2011) was an American stage actress and television director known for her work in the Broadway theater.

Lloyd met her future husband, actor Norman Lloyd, while they were co-starring in the play Crime, which was directed by Elia Kazan. The couple married on June 29, 1936, and remained together until her death, 75 years later. They became known for their joint appearances in the Federal Theatre Project, which was run by the Works Progress Administration, early in their marriage during the 1930s.

In 1937, Lloyd starred in the Broadway production of Having Wonderful Time with John Garfield. She also appeared in a Broadway production of Romeo and Juliet, directed by Katharine Cornell.

== Personal life ==
Peggy Craven was a graduate of the Horace Mann School with the class of 1931. In 2007, Peggy and Norman Lloyd were featured in the documentary Who Is Norman Lloyd? She died of natural causes on August 30, 2011 at age 98. She was survived by her husband of 75 years and their two children, one of whom was the actress Josie Lloyd.
