= Federal Theatre Project =

USA theatre company 1935–1939

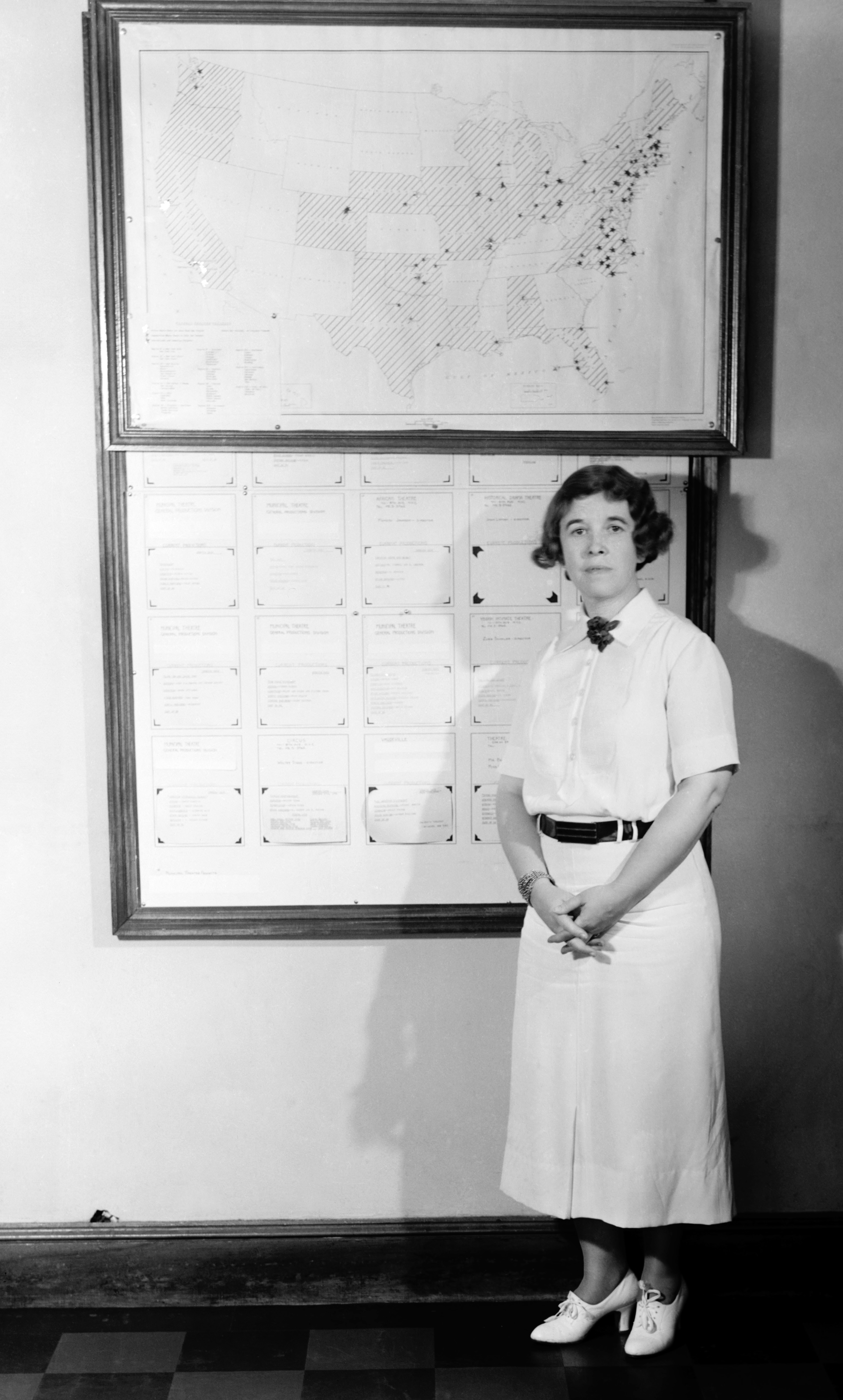
National director Hallie Flanagan with bulletin boards identifying Federal Theatre Project productions under way throughout the United States

The Federal Theatre Project (FTP; 1935–1939) was a theatre program established during the Great Depression as part of the New Deal to fund live artistic performances and entertainment programs in the United States. It was one of five Federal Project Number One projects sponsored by the Works Progress Administration, created not as a cultural activity but as a relief measure to employ artists, writers, directors, and theater workers. National director Hallie Flanagan shaped the FTP into a federation of regional theaters that created relevant art, encouraged experimentation in new forms and techniques, and made it possible for millions of Americans to see live theatre for the first time. Although The Federal Theatre project consumed only 0.5% of the allocated budget from the WPA and was widely considered a commercial and critical success, the project became a source of heated political contention. Congress responded to the project's racial integration and accusations of Communist infiltration and cancelled its funding effective June 30, 1939. One month before the project's end, drama critic Brooks Atkinson summarized: "Although the Federal Theatre is far from perfect, it has kept an average of ten thousand people employed on work that has helped to lift the dead weight from the lives of millions of Americans. It has been the best friend the theatre as an institution has ever had in this country."

== Background ==
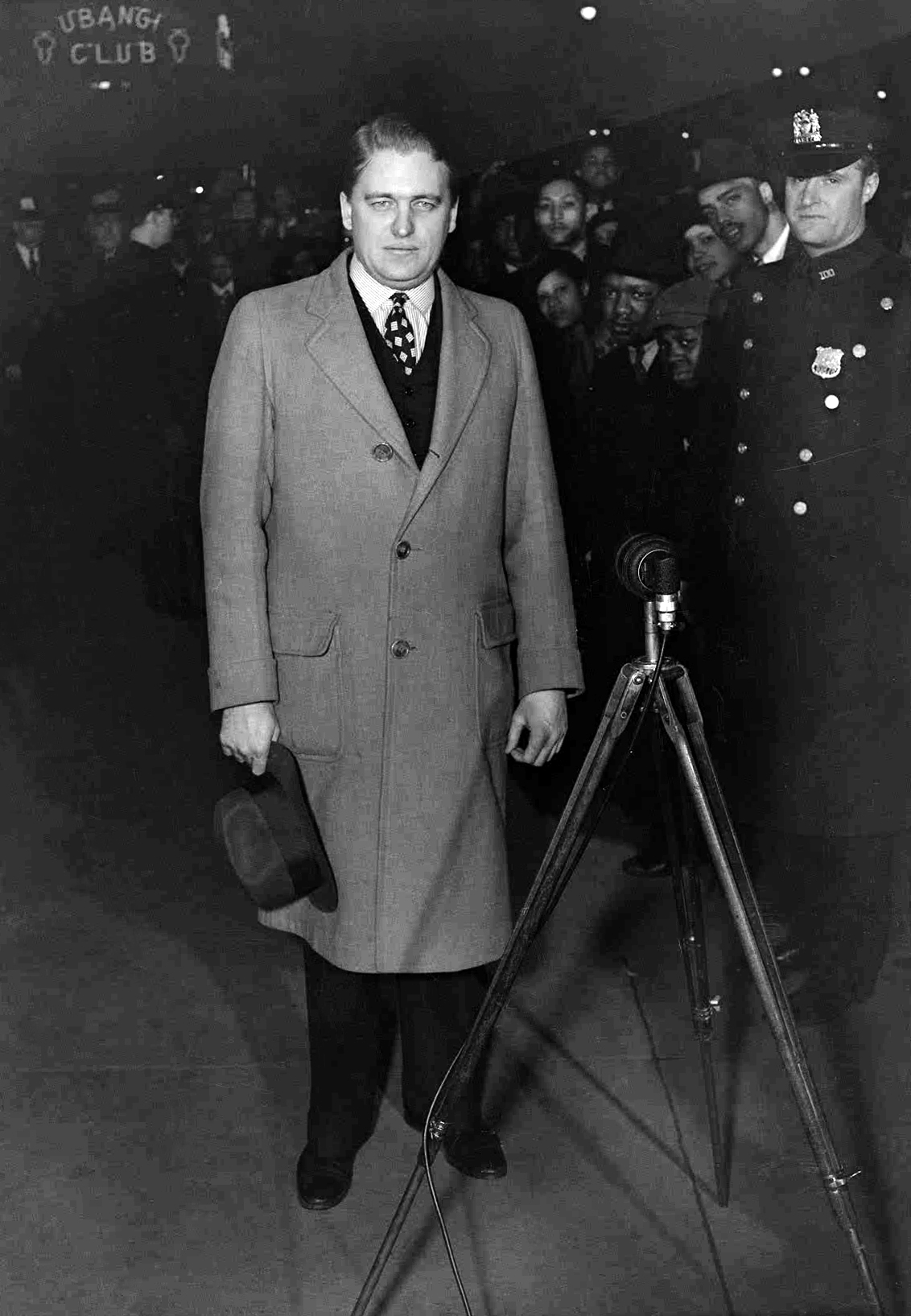
Philip W. Barber, New York City director of the Federal Theatre Project, at the opening of Macbeth (April 14, 1936)

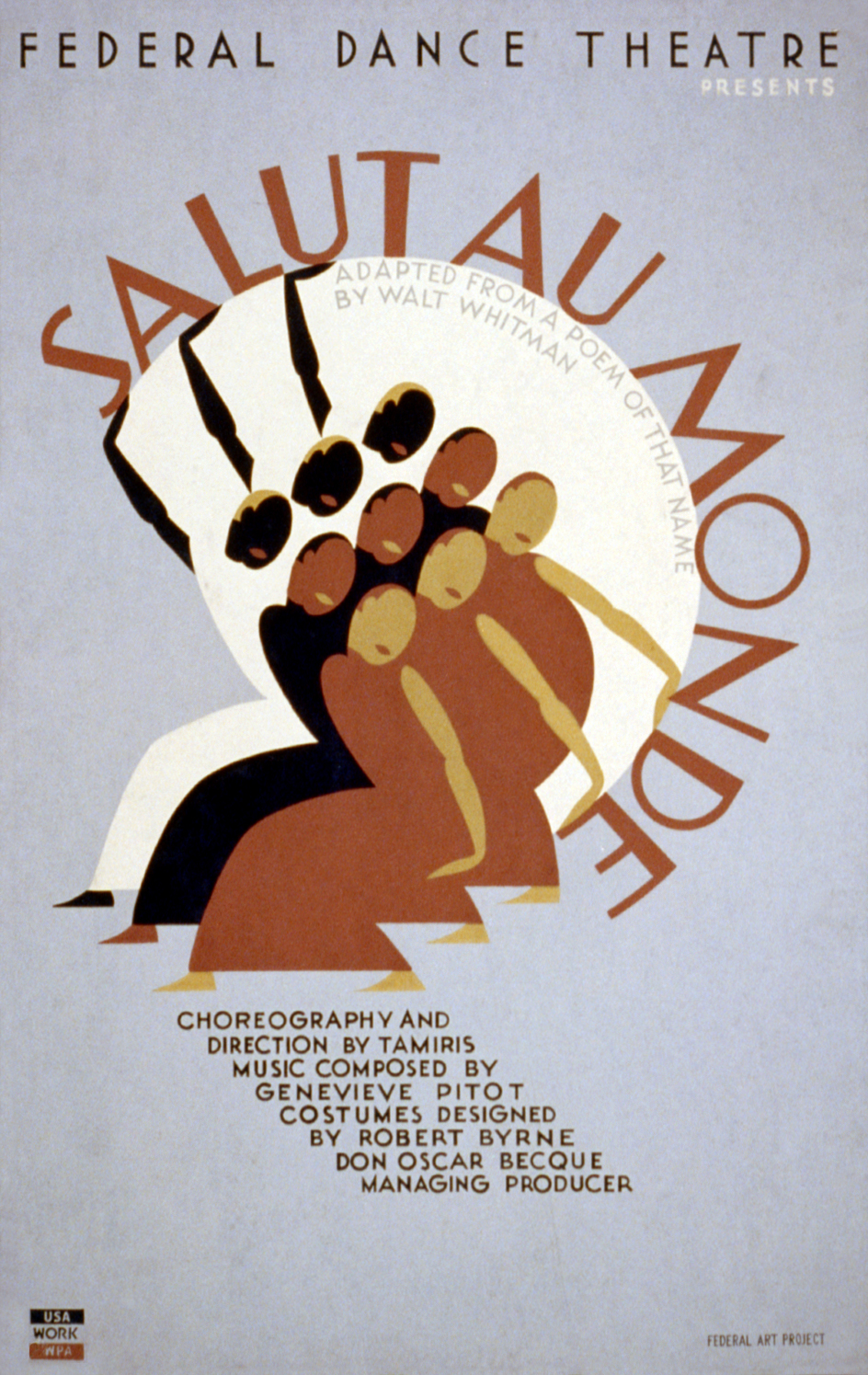
Poster for Salut au Monde (1936), an original dance drama by Helen Tamiris for the Federal Dance Theatre, a division of the Federal Theatre Project

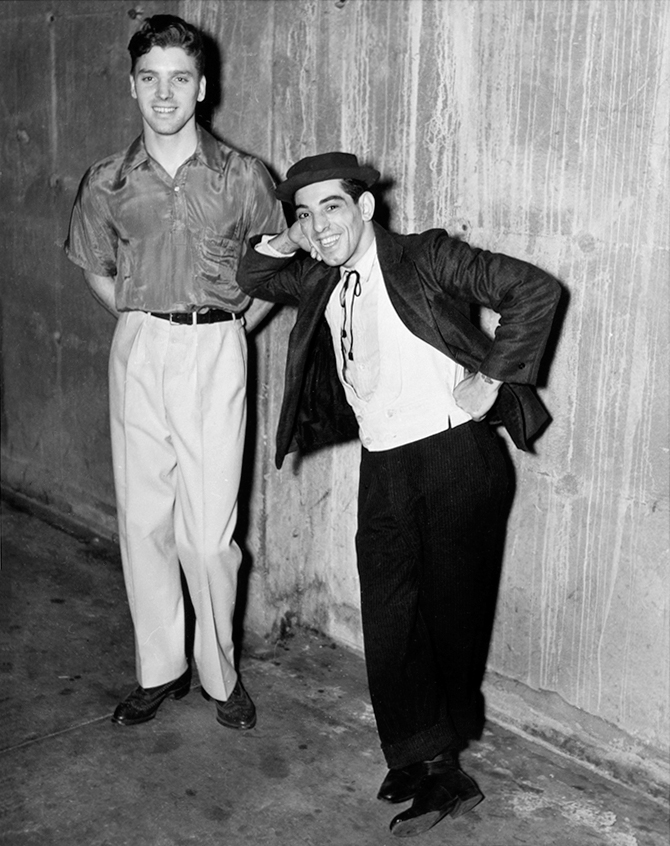
Burt Lancaster and partner Nick Cravat with the Federal Theatre Circus (1935–1938)

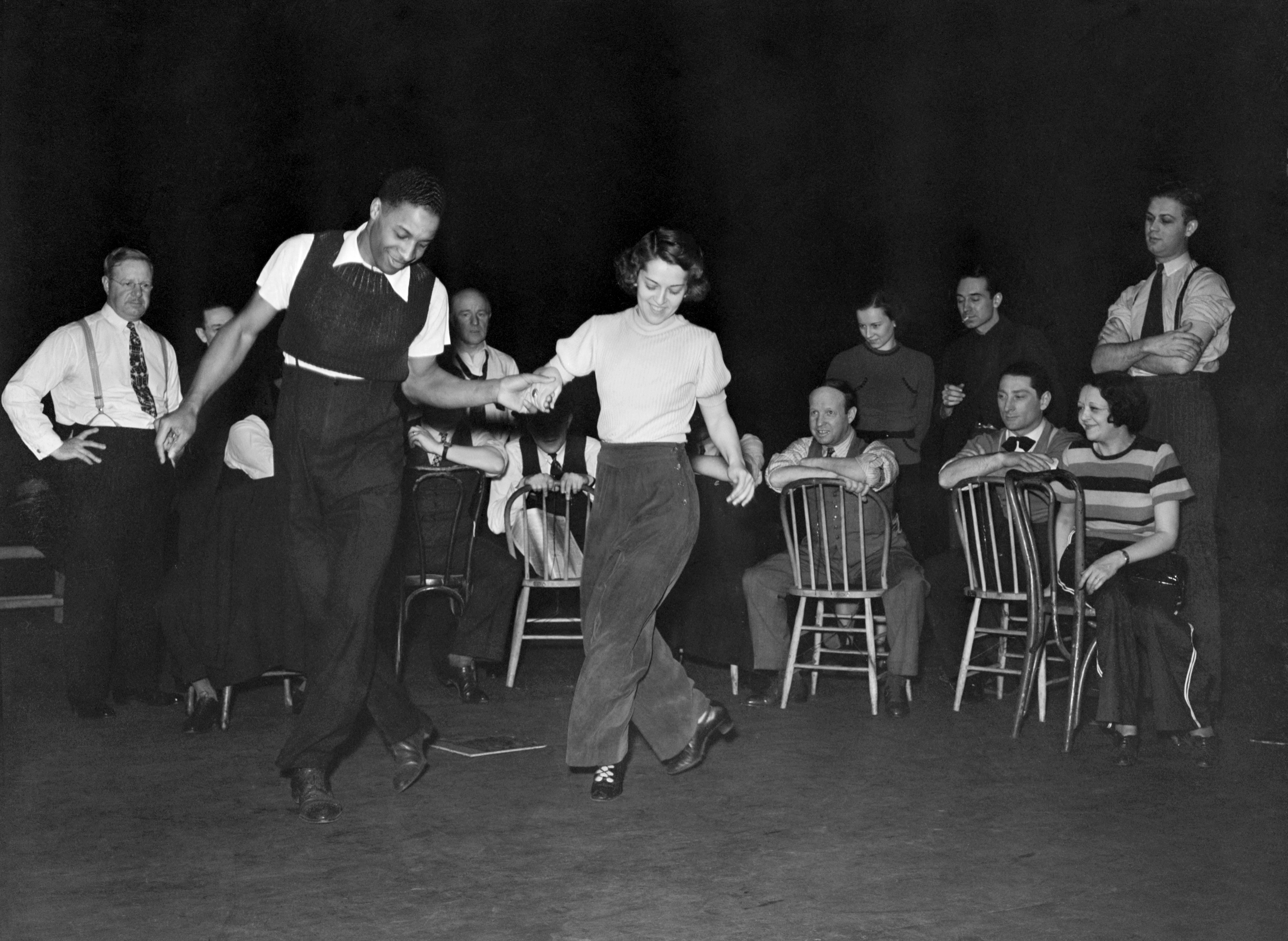
Choreographer Clarence Yates rehearsing Olive Stanton and the cast of The Cradle Will Rock (1937)

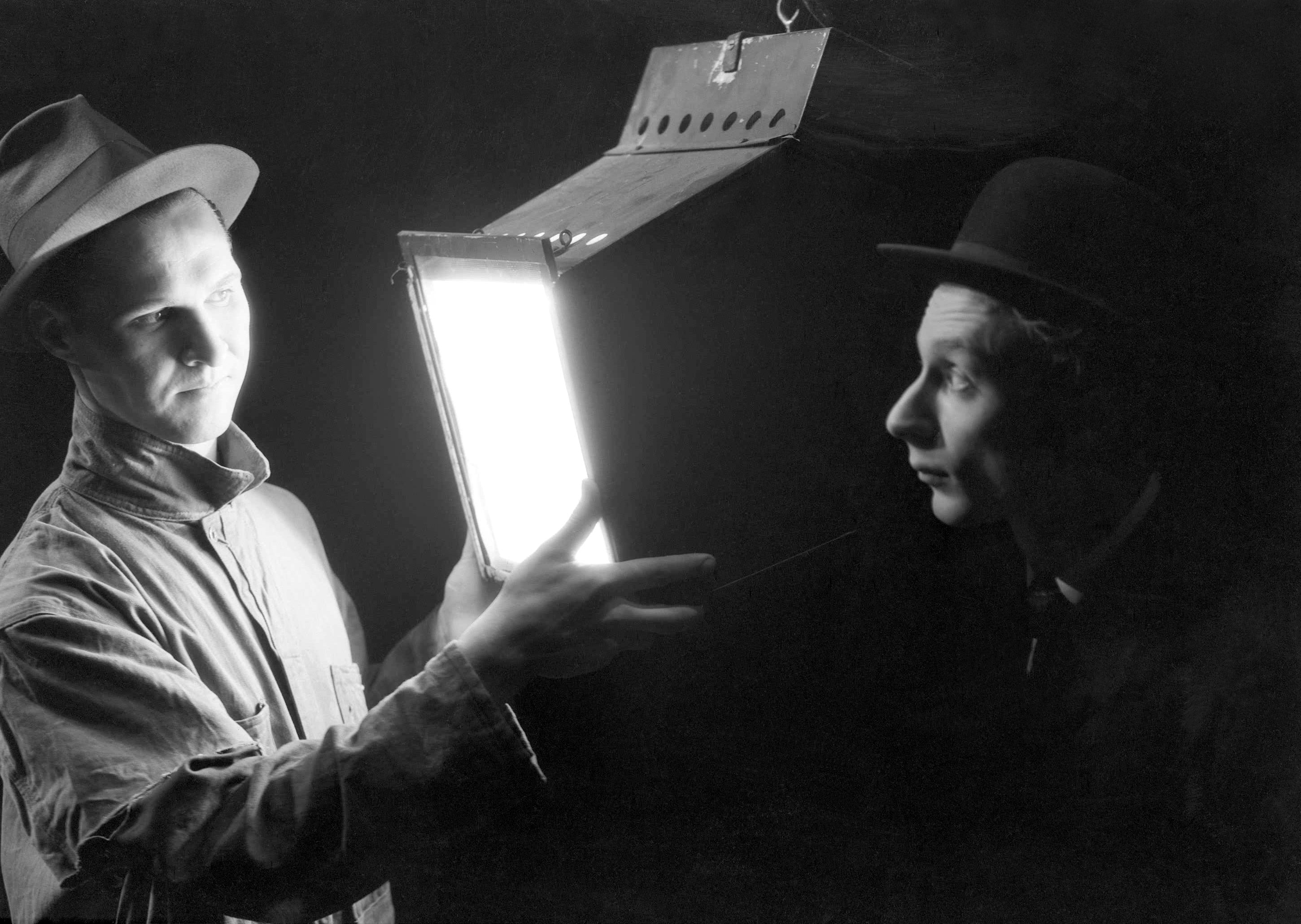
The Man Who Knows All (Robert Noack) explains the kilowatt hour to the Consumer (Norman Lloyd) in the Living Newspaper play, Power (1937)

We let out these works on the vote of the people.

— Motto of the Federal Theatre Project, from an inscription at the third century B.C. Greek theatre on Delos

Part of the Works Progress Administration, the Federal Theatre Project was a New Deal program established August 27, 1935, funded under the Emergency Relief Appropriation Act of 1935. Of the $4.88 billion allocated to the WPA, $27 million was approved for the employment of artists, musicians, writers and actors under the WPA's Federal Project Number One.

Government relief efforts funding theatre through the Federal Emergency Relief Administration and Civil Works Administration in the two preceding years were amateur experiments regarded as charity, not a theatre program. The Federal Theatre Project was a new approach to unemployment in the theatre profession. Only those certified as employable could be offered work, and that work was to be within the individual's defined skills and trades.

"For the first time in the relief experiments of this country the preservation of the skill of the worker, and hence the preservation of his self-respect, became important," wrote Hallie Flanagan, director of the Federal Theatre Project. A theater professor at Vassar College who had studied the operation of government-sponsored theatre abroad for the Guggenheim Foundation, Flanagan was chosen to lead the Federal Theatre Project by WPA head Harry Hopkins. Flanagan and Hopkins had been classmates at Grinnell College. Roosevelt and Hopkins selected her despite considerable pressure to choose someone from the commercial theatre industry; they believed the project should be led by someone with academic credentials and a national perspective. Flanagan had the daunting task of building a nationwide theater program to employ thousands of unemployed artists in as little time as possible. The Theatre industry had struggled financially prior to the financial collapse of 1929. By that time it was already threatened with extinction due to the growing popularity of films and radio, but the commercial theatre was reluctant to adapt its practices. Many actors, technicians and stagehands had suffered since 1914, when movies began to replace stock, vaudeville and other live stage performances nationwide. Sound motion pictures displaced 30,000 musicians. In the Great Depression, people with little money for entertainment found an entire evening of entertainment at the movies for 25 cents, while commercial theatre charged $1.10 to $2.20 admission to cover the cost of theater rental, advertising and fees to performers and union technicians. Unemployed directors, actors, designers, musicians and stage crew took any kind of work they were able to find, whatever it paid, and charity was often their only recourse.

"This is a tough job we're asking you to do," Hopkins told Flanagan at their first meeting in May 1935. "I don't know why I still hang on to the idea that unemployed actors get just as hungry as anybody else."

Hopkins promised "a free, adult, uncensored theatre" — something Flanagan spent the next four years trying to build. She emphasized the development of local and regional theatre, "to lay the foundation for the development of a truly creative theatre in the United States with outstanding producing centers in each of those regions which have common interests as a result of geography, language origins, history, tradition, custom, occupations of the people."

== Operation ==
On October 24, 1935, Flanagan prefaced her instructions on the Federal Theatre's operation with a statement of purpose:

The primary aim of the Federal Theatre Project is the reemployment of theatre workers now on public relief rolls: actors, directors, playwrights, designers, vaudeville artists, stage technicians, and other workers in the theatre field. The far reaching purpose is the establishment of theatres so vital to community life that they will continue to function after the program of this Federal Project is completed.

Within a year the Federal Theatre Project employed 15,000 men and women, paying them $23.86 a week while the Actors Equity Association's minimum was $40.00. These men and women would only do six performances a week and have only four hours per day to rehearse. During its nearly four years of existence 30 million people attended FTP productions in more than 200 theaters nationwide — renting many that had been shuttered — as well as parks, schools, churches, clubs, factories, hospitals and closed-off streets. Its productions totaled approximately 1,200, not including its radio programs. Because the Federal Theatre was created to employ and train people, not to generate revenue, no provision was made for the receipt of money when the project began. At its conclusion, 65 percent of its productions were still presented free of charge. The total cost of the Federal Theatre Project was $46 million.

"In any consideration of the cost of the Federal Theatre," Flanagan wrote, "it should be borne in mind that the funds were allotted, according to the terms of the Relief Act of 1935, to pay wages to unemployed people. Therefore, when Federal Theatre was criticized for spending money, it was criticized for doing what it was set up to do."

The FTP established five regional centers in New York, New York, Boston (Northeast), Chicago (Midwest), Los Angeles (West), and New Orleans (South). The FTP did not operate in every state, since many lacked a sufficient number of unemployed people in the theatre profession. The project in Alabama was closed in January 1937 when its personnel were transferred to a new unit in Georgia. Only one event was presented in Arkansas. Units created in Minnesota, Missouri and Wisconsin were closed in 1936; projects in Indiana, Nebraska, Rhode Island and Texas were discontinued in 1937; and the Iowa project was closed in 1938.

Many of the notable artists of the time participated in the Federal Theatre Project, including Susan Glaspell who served as Midwest bureau director. The legacy of the Federal Theatre Project can also be found in beginning the careers of a new generation of theater artists. Arthur Miller, Orson Welles, John Houseman, Martin Ritt, Elia Kazan, Joseph Losey, Marc Blitzstein and Abe Feder are among those who became established, in part, through their work in the Federal Theatre. Blitzstein, Houseman, Welles and Feder collaborated on the controversial production, The Cradle Will Rock.

== Living Newspaper ==
Living Newspapers were plays written by teams of researchers-turned-playwrights. These men and women clipped articles from newspapers about current events, often hot button issues like farm policy, syphilis (spirochete) infection, the Tennessee Valley Authority, and housing inequity. These newspaper clippings were adapted into plays intended to inform audiences, often with progressive or left-wing themes. Triple-A Plowed Under, for instance, attacked the U.S. Supreme Court for killing the Agricultural Adjustment Act. These politically themed plays quickly drew criticism from members of Congress.

Although the undisguised political invective in the Living Newspaper productions sparked controversy, they also proved popular with audiences. As an art form, the Living Newspaper is perhaps the Federal Theatre's most well-known work.

Problems with the Federal Theatre Project and Congress intensified when the State Department objected to the first Living Newspaper, Ethiopia, about Haile Selassie and his nation's struggles against Benito Mussolini's invading Italian forces. The U.S. government soon mandated that the FTP, a government agency, could not depict foreign heads of state on the stage for fear of diplomatic backlash. Playwright and director Elmer Rice, head of the New York office of the FTP, resigned in protest and was succeeded by his assistant, Philip W. Barber.

=== New productions ===
Numbers following the city of origin indicate the number of additional cities where the play was presented.

Title	Author	City	Dates
Highlights of 1935	Living Newspaper staff	New York	May 12–30, 1936
Injunction Granted	Living Newspaper staff	New York	July 24 – October 20, 1936
Living Newspaper, First Edition	Cleveland Bronner	Norwalk, Conn.	June 1 – July 2, 1936
Living Newspaper, Second Edition	Cleveland Bronner	Norwalk, Conn.	August 18–25, 1936
The Living Newspaper	Project staff	Cleveland	March 11–28, 1936
One-Third of a Nation	Arthur Arent	New York + 9	January 17 – October 22, 1938
Power	Arthur Arent	New York + 4	February 23 – July 10, 1937
Spirochete	Arnold Sundgaard	Chicago + 4	April 29 – June 4, 1938
Triple-A Plowed Under	Living Newspaper staff	New York + 4	March 14 – May 2, 1936

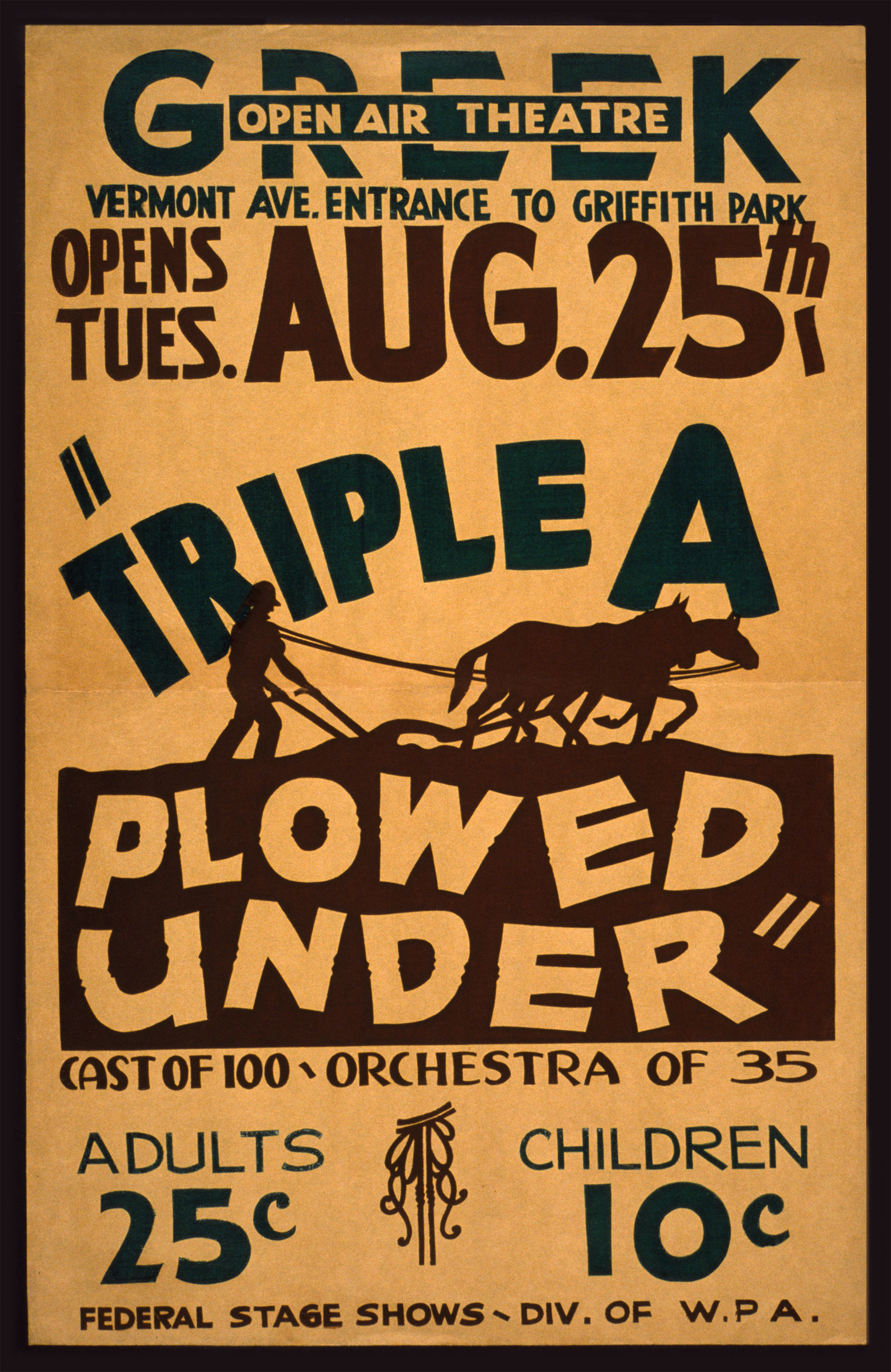

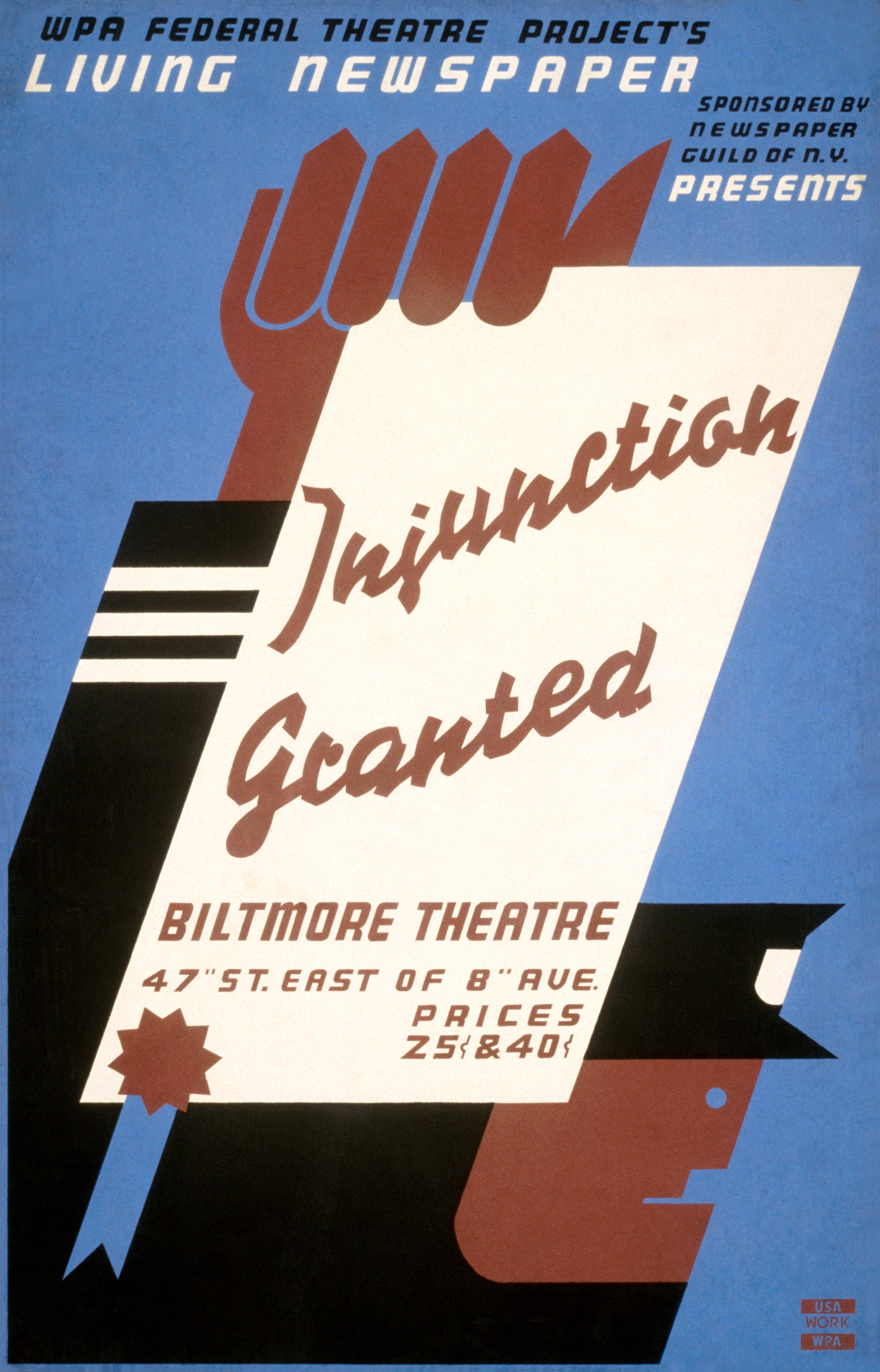

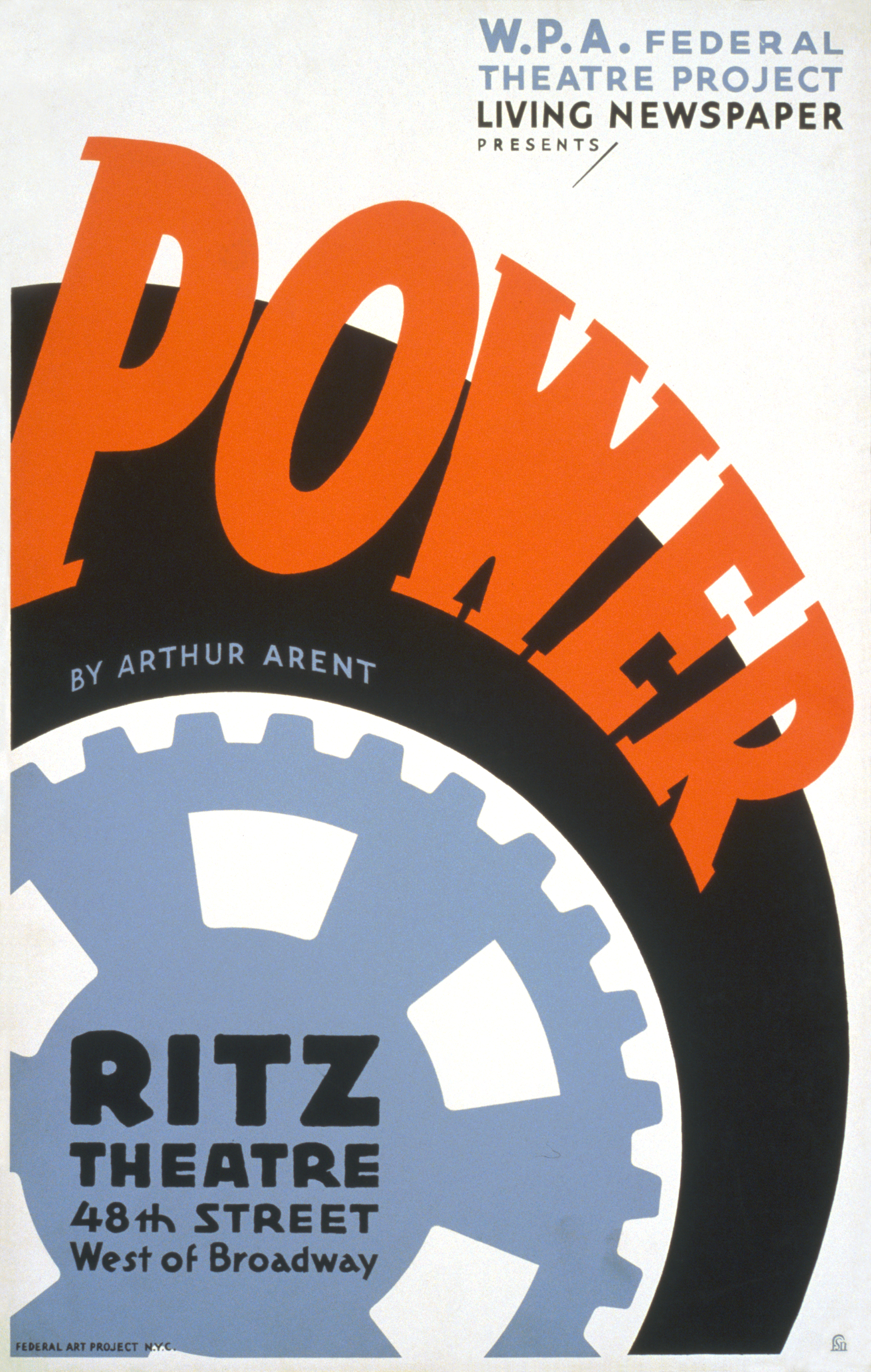

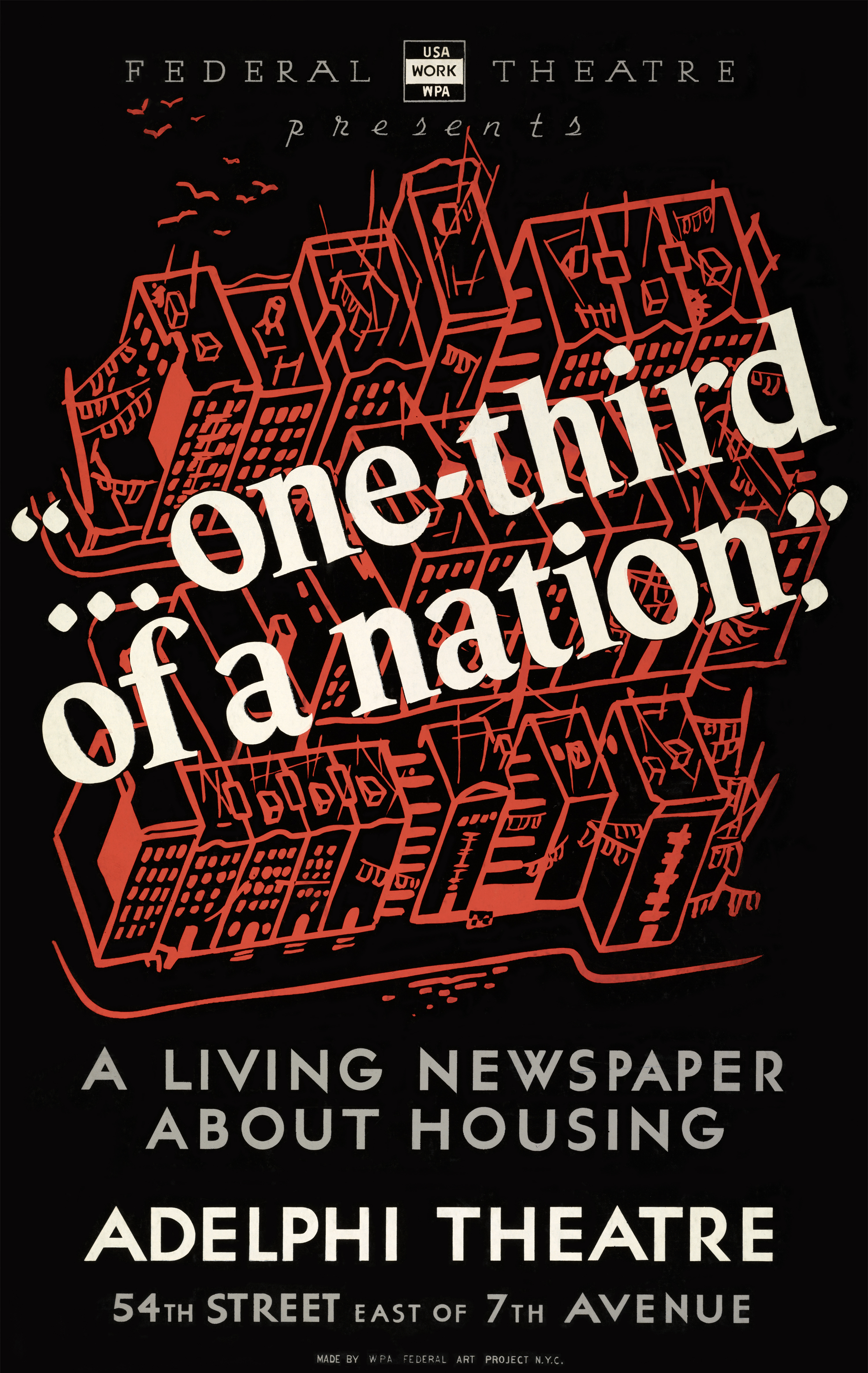

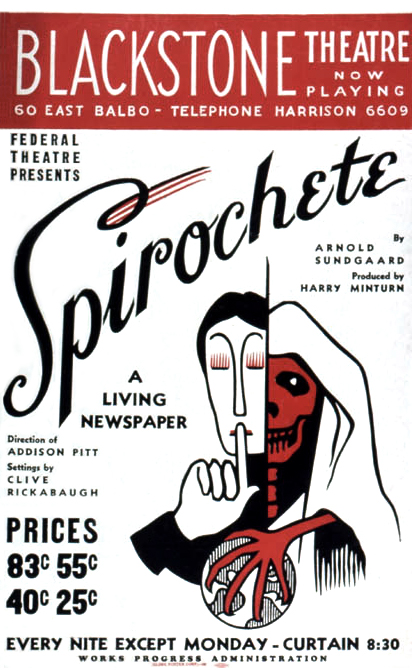

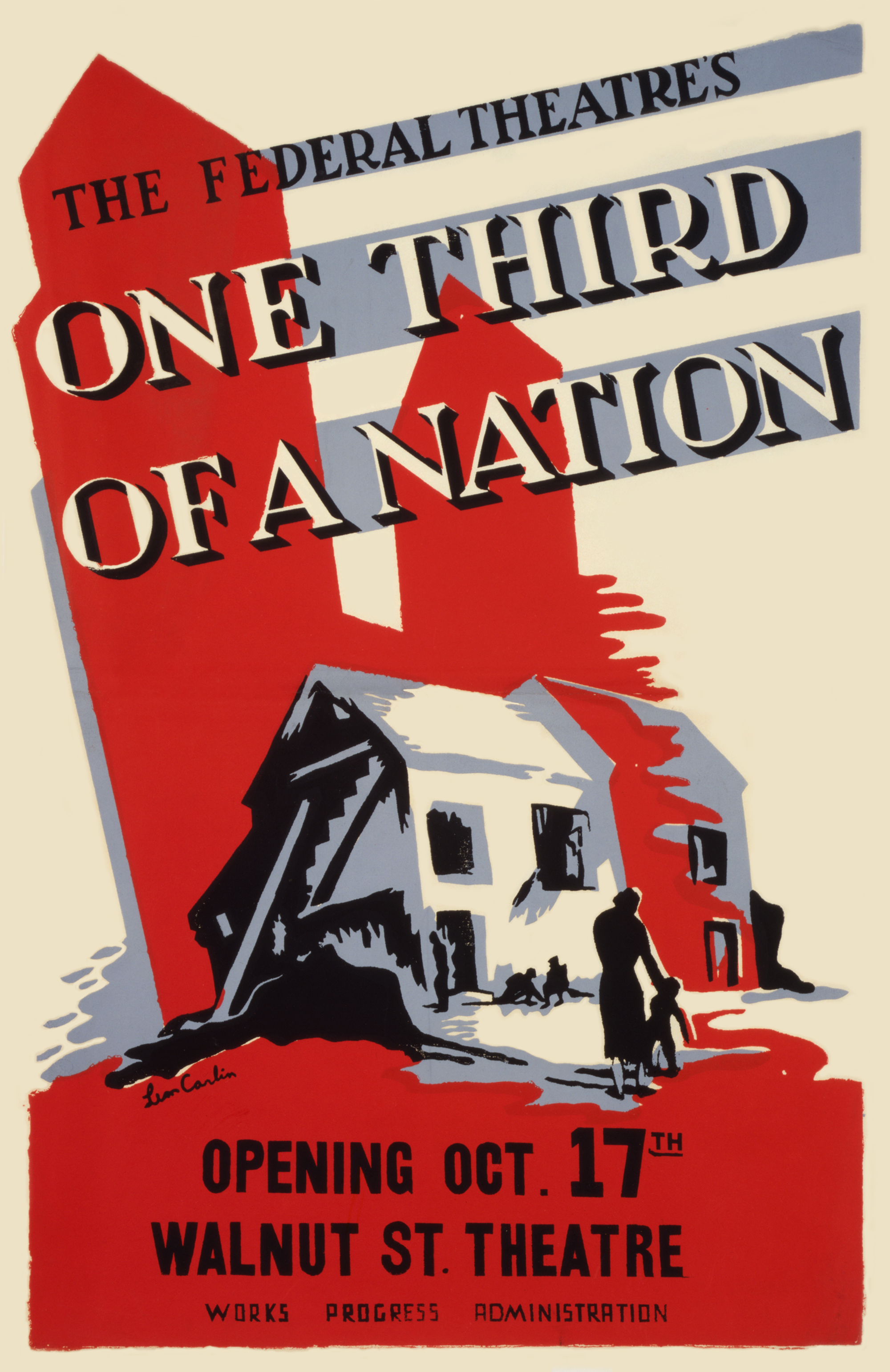

== African-American theatre ==
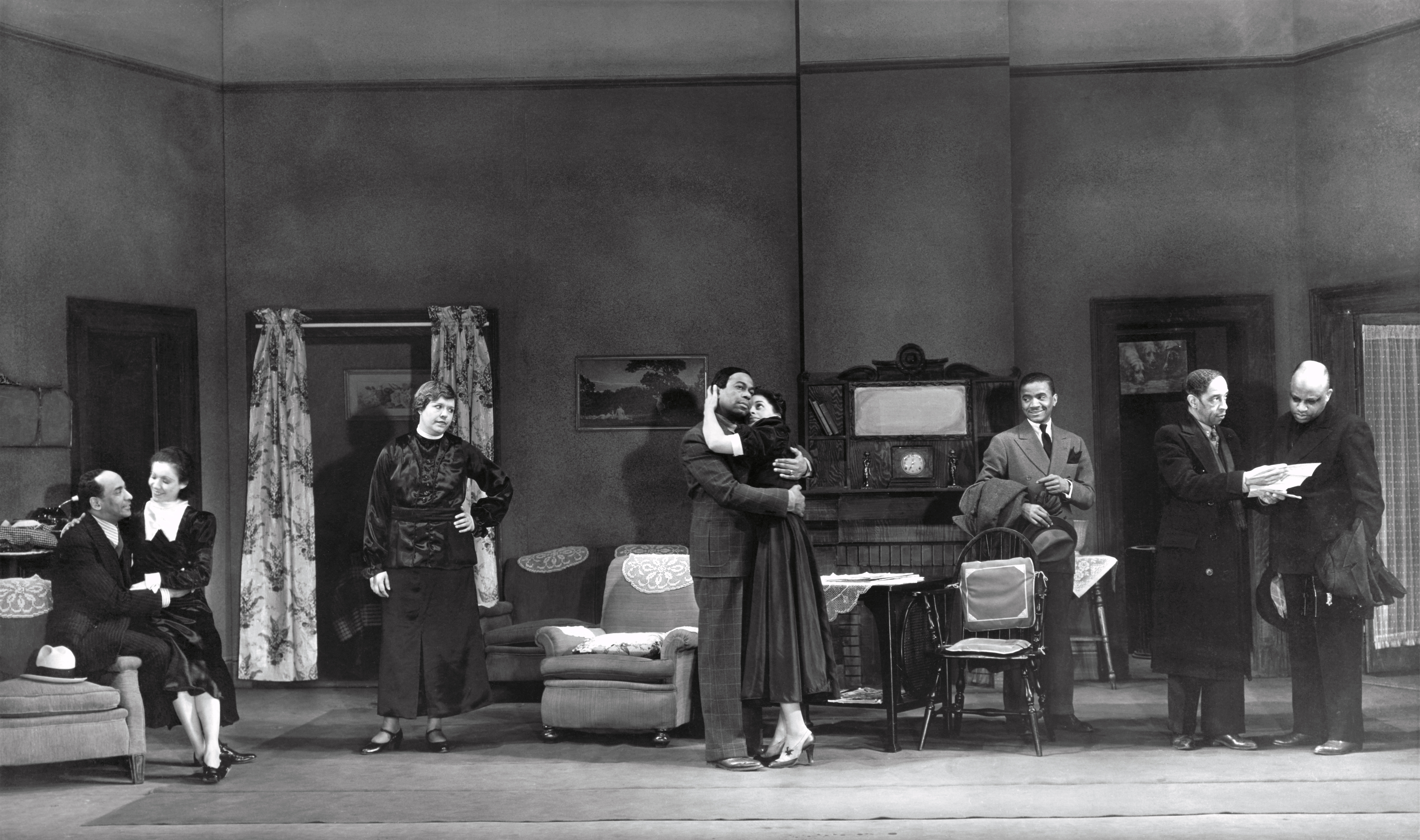
Dooley Wilson (center) in The Show-Off (1937)

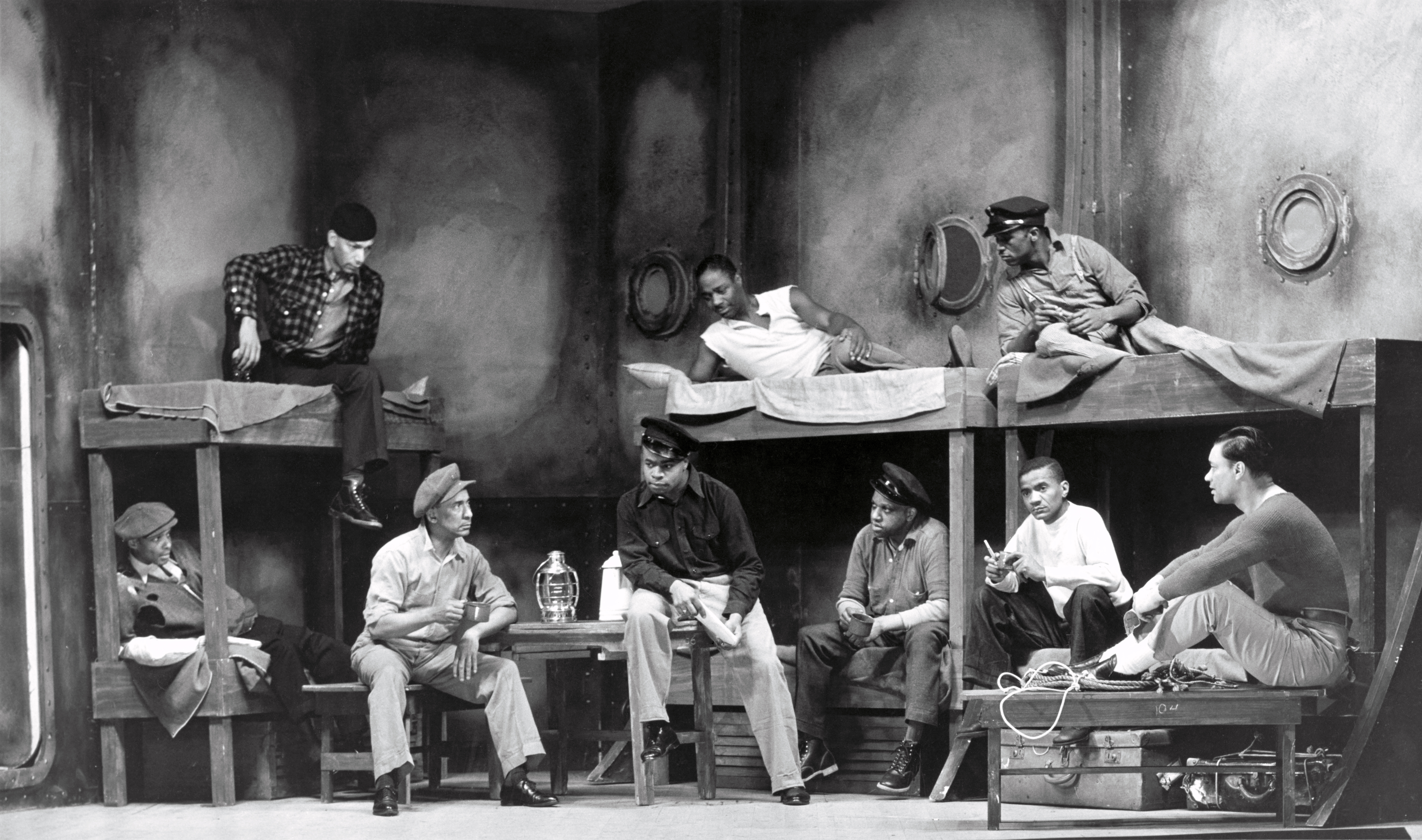
Canada Lee (top row center) in a revival of four one-act plays of the sea by Eugene O'Neill (1937)

Capitalizing on the FTP's national network and inherent diversity of artists, the Federal Theatre established specific chapters dedicated to showcasing and celebrating the work of previously under-represented artists. Including the French Theatre in Los Angeles, the German Theater in New York City, and the Negro Theatre Unit which had several chapters across the country, with its largest office in New York City. The FTP set up 17 so-called Negro Theatre Units (NTU) in cities throughout the United States. The NTU had additional offices in Hartford, Boston, Salem, Newark, and Philadelphia in the East; Seattle, Portland, and Los Angeles in the West; Cleveland, Detroit, Peoria, and Chicago in the Midwest; and Raleigh, Atlanta, Birmingham, and New Orleans in the South. There were additional units in San Francisco, Oklahoma, Durham, Camden, and Buffalo. By the project's conclusion, 22 American cities had served as headquarters for black theater units.

The New York Negro Theatre Unit was the most well known. Two of the four federal theaters in New York City—Lafayette Theatre and the Negro Youth Theater— were dedicated to the Harlem community with the intention of developing unknown theatre artists.

Both theatre projects were headquartered at the Lafayette Theatre in Harlem, where some 30 plays were presented. The first was Frank H. Wilson's folk drama, Walk Together Chillun (1936), about the deportation of 100 African-Americans from the South to the North to work for low wages. The second was Conjur' Man Dies (1936), a comedy-mystery adapted by Arna Bontemps and Countee Cullen from Rudolph Fisher's novel. The most popular production was the third, which came to be called the Voodoo Macbeth (1936), director Orson Welles's adaptation of Shakespeare's play set on a mythical island suggesting the Haitian court of King Henri Christophe.

The New York Negro Theatre Unit also oversaw projects from the African American Dance Unit featuring Nigerian artists displaced by the Ethiopian Crisis. These projects employed over 1,000 black actors and directors. The Negro Actors' Guild of America incorporated on October 1, 1936, in the state of New York. The ten Articles for the Certificate of Incorporation addressed the welfare, appreciation and development of black artists.

The Federal Theatre Project was distinguished for its focus on racial injustice. Flanagan expressly ordered her subordinates to follow the WPA policy against racial prejudice. In fact when it came to making decisions on a national level for the project, the Federal Theatre Regulation mandated that "there may be racial representation in all national planning." A specific example of the FTP's adherence to an anti-prejudicial environment came when a white project manager in Dallas was fired for attempting to segregate black and white theater technicians on a railroad car. Additionally, the white assistant director of the project was pulled because "he was unable to work amicably" with the black artists.

The FTP overtly sought out relationships with the African American community including Carter Woodson of the Association for the Study of Negro Life and History, as well as Walter White of the NAACP. One of the existing stipulations from the Works Progress Administration for employment in the FTP was prior professional theater experience. However, when encountered with 40 young jobless black playwrights, national director Hallie Flanagan waived the WPA requirement in the interest of providing a platform and training ground for new young playwrights. During a national conference Flanagan proposed that the leadership of the Harlem chapter of the FTP be led by an African American artist. Rose McClendon, an established actor at the time, publicly argued against this proposal and instead suggested that initially an established white theater artist take the mantle with the understanding and intention of satisfying the WPA's prior professional theater experience clause and giving way to black artists to lead the chapter. This argument from McClendon received support from Edna Thomas, Harry Edwards, Carlton Moss, Abraham Hale Jr., Augusta Smith and Dick Campbell.

This crusade for equality eventually became a sticking point for the Dies Committee, which pulled funding for the Federal Theater Project, arguing that "racial equality forms a vital part of the Communist dictatorship and practices".

=== New drama productions ===
Numbers following the city of origin indicate the number of additional cities where the play was presented.

Title	Author	City	Dates
Accident Policy	Arthur Akers	Birmingham	July 31 – August 3, 1936
Advent and Nativity of Christ	adapted by Hedley Gordon Graham	New York	December 20–24, 1937
Bassa Moona (The Land I Love)	Momodu Johnson, Norman Coker	New York	December 8, 1936 – March 20, 1937
Big White Fog	Theodore Ward	Chicago	April 7 – May 30, 1938
Black Empire	Christine Ames, Clarke Painter	Los Angeles + 1	March 16 – July 19, 1936
The Case of Philip Lawrence	George MacEntree	New York	June 8 – July 31, 1937
Conjur' Man Dies	Rudolph Fisher, adapted by Arna Bontemps and Countee Cullen	New York + 1	March 11 – July 4, 1936
Did Adam Sin?	Lew Payton	Chicago	April 30 – May 14, 1936
An Evening with Dunbar	Paul Laurence Dunbar, adapted by project staff	Seattle	October 31 – December 17, 1938
Great Day	M. Wood	Birmingham	October 7, 1936
Haiti	William DuBois	New York + 1	March 2 – November 5, 1938
Heaven Bound	Nellie Lindley Davis, adapted by Julian Harris	Atlanta	October 10, 1937 – January 8, 1938
Home in Glory	Clyde Limbaugh	Birmingham	April 16 – May 15, 1936
It Can't Happen Here	Sinclair Lewis, John C. Moffitt	Seattle + 20	October 27 – November 6, 1936
Jericho	H. L. Fishel	Philadelphia + 3	October 16, 1937 – April 4, 1938
John Henry	Frank Wells	Los Angeles	September 30 – October 18, 1936
Lysistrata	Aristophanes, adapted by Theodore Browne	Seattle	September 17, 1936
Macbeth	William Shakespeare, adapted by Orson Welles	New York + 8	April 14 – October 17, 1936
The Natural Man	Theodore Browne	Seattle	January 28 – February 20, 1937
The Swing Mikado	adapted from Gilbert and Sullivan	Chicago + 3	September 25, 1938 – February 25, 1939
Return to Death	P. Washington Porter	Holyoke, Mass.	August 17–20, 1938
The Reverend Takes His Text	Ralf Coleman	Roxbury, Mass. + 3	December 12, 1936
Romey and Julie	Robert Dunmore, Ruth Chorpenning	Chicago	April 1–25, 1936
Sweet Land	Conrad Seiler	New York	January 19 – February 27, 1937
The Taming of the Shrew	William Shakespeare, adapted by project staff	Seattle	June 19–24, 1939
The Trial of Dr. Beck	Hughes Allison	New Jersey Spots + 2	June 3–12, 1937
Trilogy in Black	Ward Courtney	Hartford	June 18, 1937
Turpentine	J. Augustus Smith, Peter Morell	New York	June 26 – September 5, 1936
Unto Such Glory	Paul Green	New York	May 6 – July 10, 1936
Walk Together Chillun	Frank H. Wilson	New York	February 4 – March 7, 1936

=== Standard drama productions ===
Numbers following the city of origin indicate the number of additional cities where the play was presented.

Title	Author	City	Dates
Androcles and the Lion	George Bernard Shaw	Seattle + 2	November 1–6, 1937
Bloodstream	Frederick Schlick	Boston	March 17–27, 1937
Bound East for Cardiff	Eugene O'Neill	New York	October 29, 1937 – January 15, 1938
Brother Mose	Frank H. Wilson	New York + 20	July 25, 1934 – December 21, 1935
Cinda	H. J. Bates	Boston + 4	January 21–24, 1936
The Emperor Jones	Eugene O'Neill	Hartford + 1	October 21–23, 1937
The Field God	Paul Green	Hartford	February 17–19, 1938
Genesis	H. J. Bates, Charles Flato	Hyde Park, Mass. + 2	February 26, 1936
Hymn to the Rising Sun	Paul Green	New York	May 6–July 10, 1937
In Abraham's Bosom	Paul Green	Seattle + 1	April 21–May 22, 1937
In the Valley	Paul Green	Hartford	September 7–10, 1938
In the Zone	Eugene O'Neill	New York	October 29, 1937 – January 15, 1938
Just Ten Days	J. Aubrey Smith	New York	August 10–September 10, 1937
The Long Voyage Home	Eugene O'Neill	New York	October 29, 1937 – January 15, 1938
Mississippi Rainbow (Brain Sweat)	John Charles Brownell	Cleveland + 7	April 18–May 10, 1936
The Moon of the Caribbees	Eugene O'Neill	New York	October 29, 1937 – January 15, 1938
Noah	André Obey	Seattle + 4	April 28–July 8, 1936
Porgy	DuBose Heyward, Dorothy Heyward	Hartford	March 17–May 14, 1938
Roll, Sweet Chariot	Paul Green	New Orleans	June 16–18, 1936
Run, Little Chillun	Hall Johnson	Los Angeles + 2	July 22, 1938 – June 10, 1939
The Sabine Women	Leonid Andreyev	Hartford	December 15–17, 1936
The Show-Off	George Kelly	Hartford	March 5–July 3, 1937
Stevedore	Paul Peters, George Sklar	Seattle	March 25–May 9, 1937
Swamp Mud	Harold Courlander	Birmingham	July 11, 1936
The World We Live In	Josef Čapek, Karel Čapek	Hartford	January 13–15, 1938

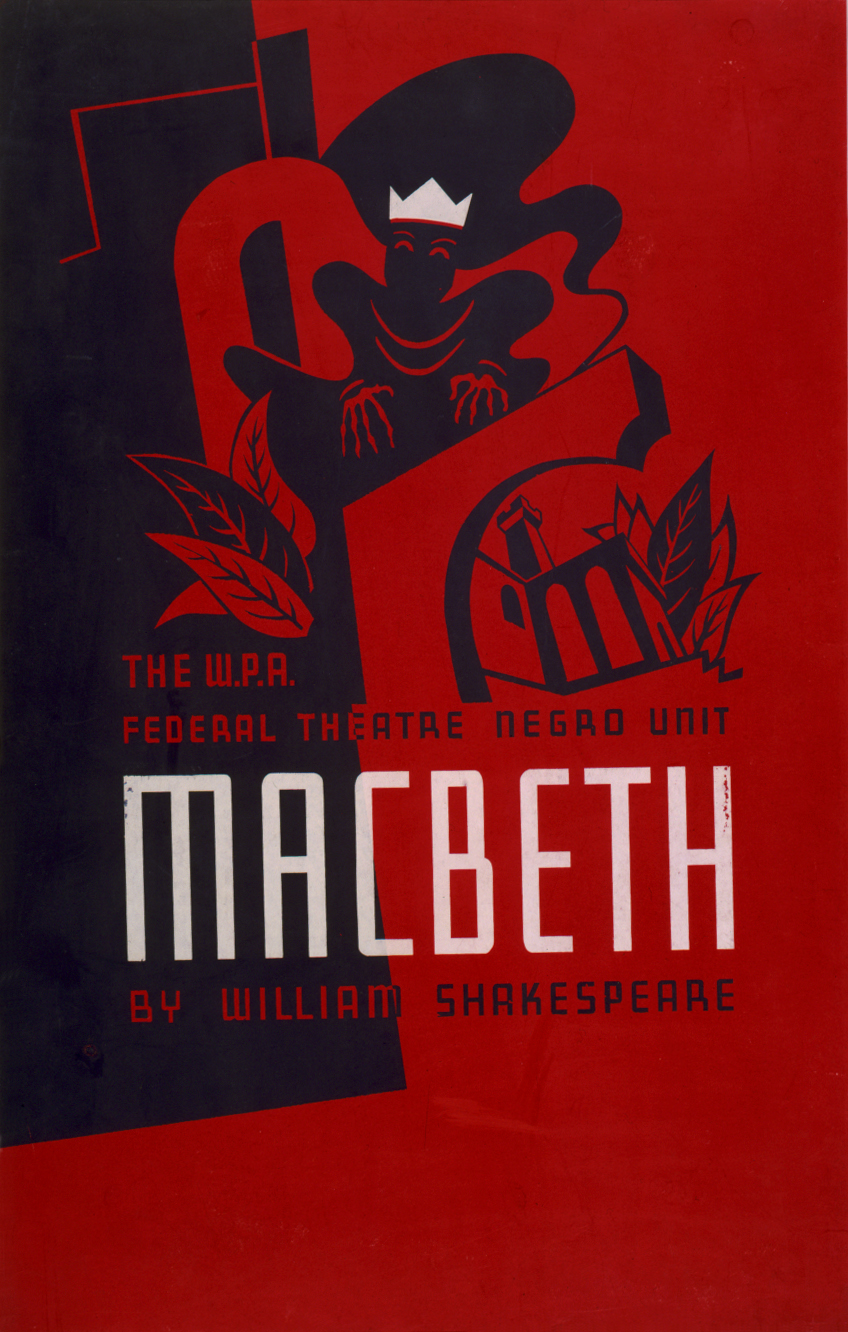

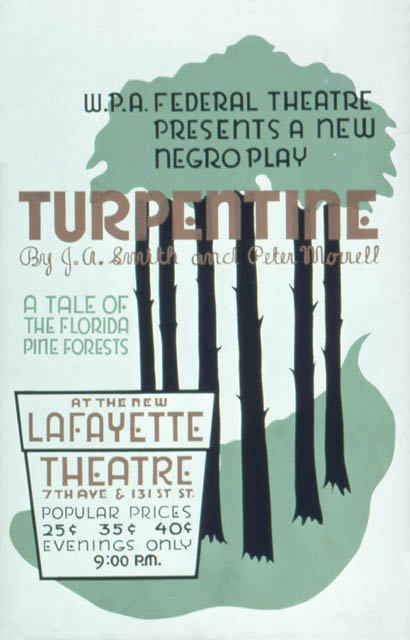

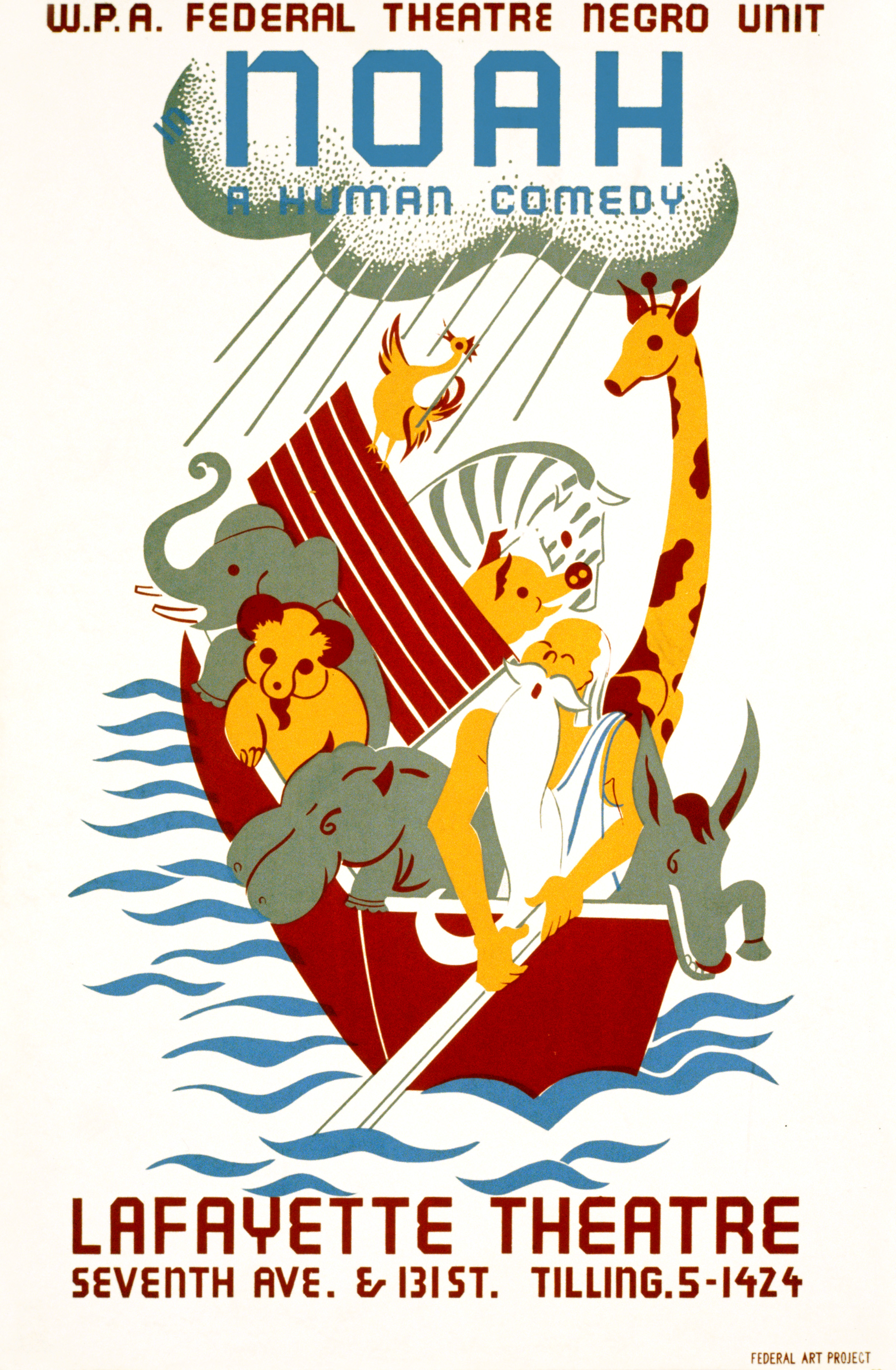

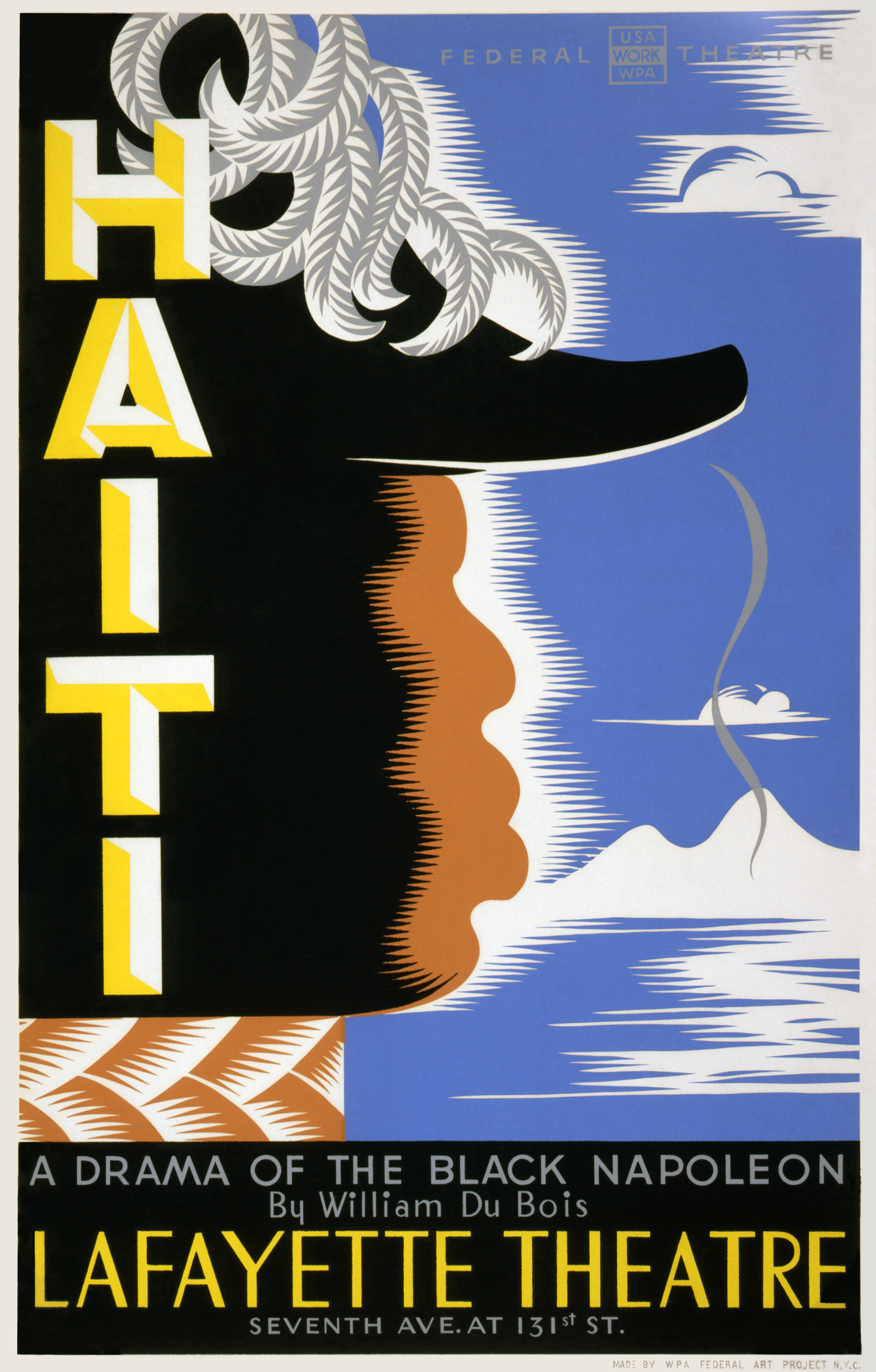

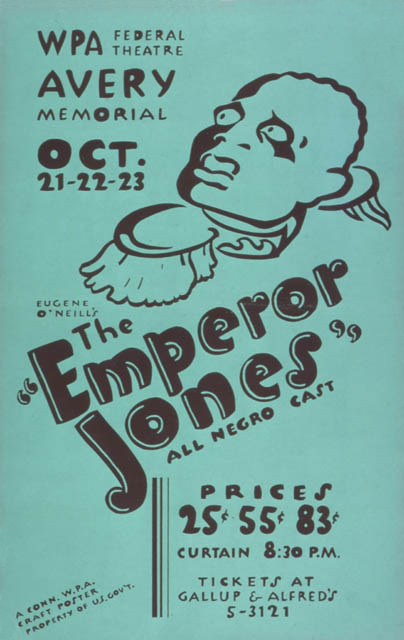

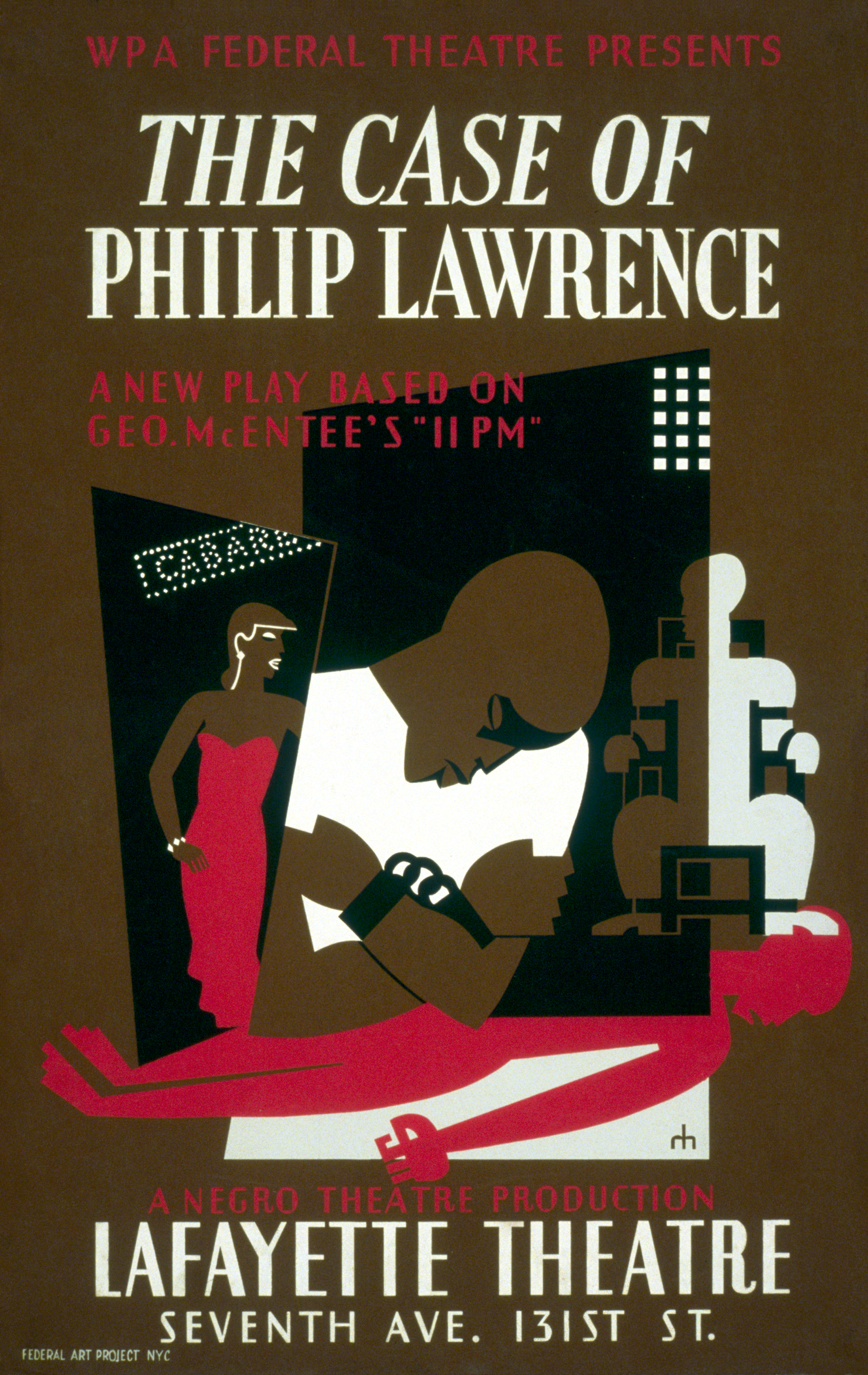

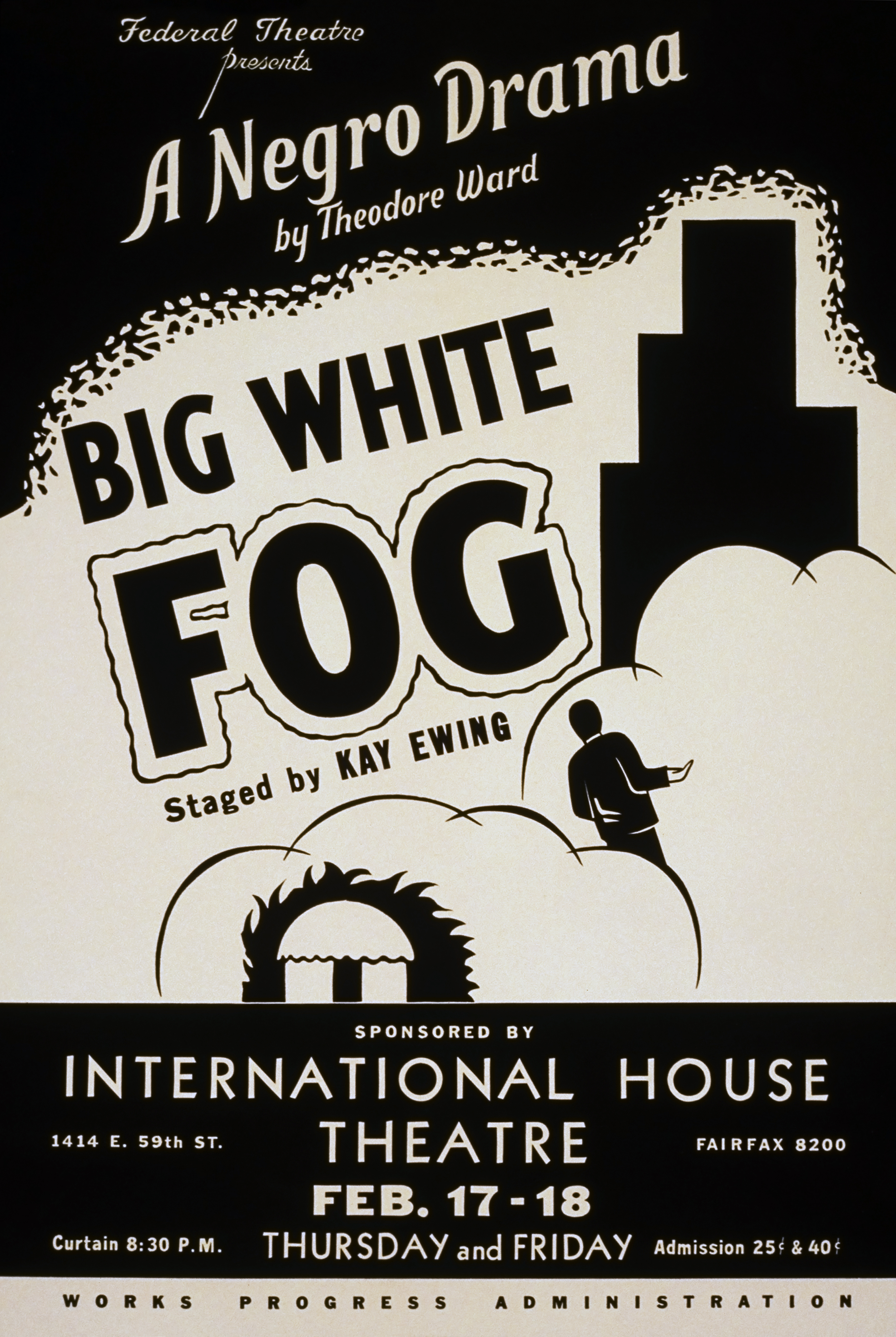

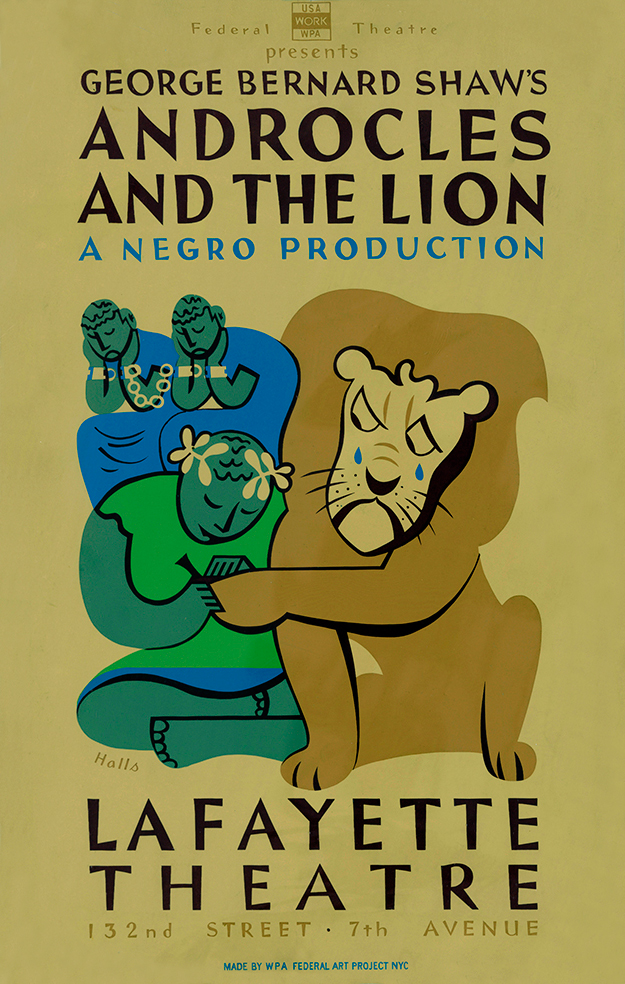

== Federal Dance Project and dance drama ==
The Federal Dance Project (FDP) was ultimately absorbed into the Federal Theater Project. Dancer Helen Tamiris was the central figure of the FDP, which existed as an independent entity from January 1936 until October 1937.

=== New productions ===
Numbers following the city of origin indicate the number of additional cities where the play was presented.

Title	Author	City	Dates
Adelante	Helen Tamiris	New York	April 20–May 6, 1939
All the Weary People	Project staff	Portland, Ore.	September 28, 1937
An American Exodus	Myra Kinch	Los Angeles + 1	July 27, 1937 – January 4, 1939
Ballet Fedre	Berta Ochsner, Grace and Kurt Graff, Katherine Dunham	Chicago	January 27–February 19, 1938
Bonneville Dam	Project staff	Timberline Lodge, Oregon	September 29, 1937
Candide	Charles Weidman	New York	June 19–30, 1936
The Eternal Prodigal	Gluck-Sandor	New York	December 2, 1936 – January 2, 1937
Fantasy 1939 (Immediate Comment)	Berta Ochsner, David Campbell	New York	June 26–27, 1939
Federal Ballet	Ruth Page, Kurt Graff	Chicago + 5	June 19–July 30, 1938
Federal Ballet (Guns and Castanets)	Ruth Page, Bentley Stone	Chicago + 1	March 1–25, 1939
Folk Dances of All Nations	Lilly Mehlman	New York	December 27, 1937 – April 11, 1938
How Long Brethren	Helen Tamiris	New York + 1	May 6, 1937 – January 15, 1938
Invitation to the Dance	Josef Castle	Tampa	July 18–22, 1937
Little Mermaid	Roger Pryor Dodge	New York	December 27, 1937 – April 11, 1938
El Maestro de Ballet	Senia Solomonoff	Tampa	July 18–22, 1937
Modern Dance Group	Project staff	Philadelphia	March 29, 1939
Mother Goose on Parade	Nadia Chilkovsky	New York	December 27, 1937 – April 11, 1938
Music in Fairyland	Myra Kinch	Los Angeles	December 25, 1937 – January 1, 1938
Prelude to Swing	Melvina Fried	Philadelphia	June 12–30, 1939
Salut au Monde	Helen Tamiris	New York	July 23–August 5, 1936–
Texas Flavor	B. Collie	Dallas	November 8–30, 1936
Trojan Incident	Euripides, adapted by Philip H. Davis	New York	April 21–May 21, 1938
With My Red Fires, To the Dance, The Race of Life	Doris Humphrey	New York	January 30 – February 4, 1939
Young Tramps	Don Oscar Becque	New York	August 6–8, 1936

== Foreign-language drama ==
These plays were given their first professional production in the United States by the Federal Theatre Project. Titles are shown as they appeared on event programs. Numbers following the city of origin indicate the number of additional cities where the play was presented.

=== New productions ===
==== German ====
Title	Author	City	Dates
Die Apostel	Rudolph Wittenberg	New York	April 15–20, 1936
Doktor Wespe	Roderich Benedix	New York	September 4–18, 1936
Einmal Mensch	Fritz Peter Buch	New York	December 3, 1936 – February 18, 1937
Seemanns-Ballade	Joachim Ringelnatz	New York	October 1–8, 1936

==== Spanish ====
Title	Author	City	Dates
Esto No Pasará Aqui	Sinclair Lewis, John C. Moffitt	Tampa	October 27–November 1, 1936

==== Yiddish ====
Title	Author	City	Dates
Awake and Sing	Clifford Odets, adapted by Chaver Paver	New York + 1	December 22, 1938 – April 9, 1939
Awake and Sing	Clifford Odets, adapted by Sigmund Largman	Los Angeles	April 1, 1937 – April 11, 1938
It Can't Happen Here	Sinclair Lewis, John C. Moffitt	Los Angeles; New York; Paterson, N. J.	October 27–November 3, 1936; October 27, 1936 – May 1, 1937; April 18–19, 1937
Monesh	I. L. Peretz, adapted by Jonah Spivak	Chicago	September 7–November 14, 1937
Professor Mamlock	Friedrich Wolf	Peabody, Mass. + 3	February 10, 1938
The Tailor Becomes a Storekeeper	David Pinski	Chicago + 1	February 25–April 9, 1938
Uptown and Downtown	Boris Thomashefsky and Cornblatt	New York	January 1, 1935 – June 17, 1936
We Live and Laugh	Project staff	New York	June 9, 1936 – March 5, 1937

== Radio ==
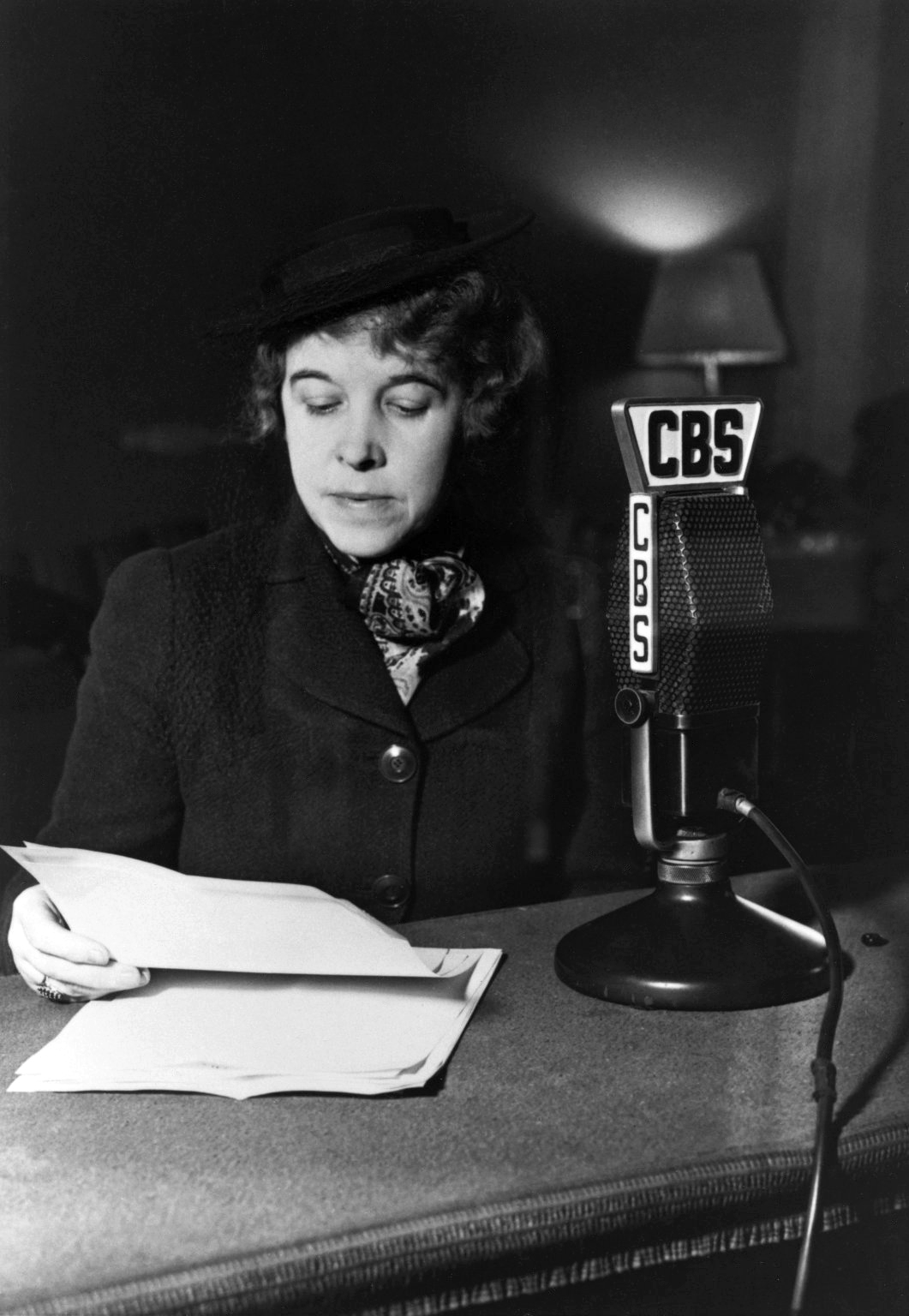
Hallie Flanagan on CBS Radio for the Federal Theatre of the Air (1936)

The Federal Theatre of the Air began weekly broadcasts March 15, 1936. For three years the radio division of the Federal Theatre Project presented an average of 3,000 programs annually on commercial stations and the NBC, Mutual and CBS networks. The major programs originated in New York; radio divisions were also created in 11 states. Series included Professional Parade, hosted by Fred Niblo; Experiments in Symphonic Drama, original stories written for classical music; Gilbert and Sullivan Light Opera, the complete works performed by Federal Theatre actors and recordings by D'Oyly Carte; Ibsen's Plays, performances of 12 major plays; Repertory Theatre of the Air, presenting literary classics; Contemporary Theatre, presenting plays by modern authors; and the interview program, Exploring the Arts and Sciences.

The radio division presented a wide range of programs on health and safety, art, music and history. The American Legion sponsored James Truslow Adams's Epic of America. The children's program, Once Upon a Time, and Paul de Kruif's Men Against Death were both honored by the National Committee for Education by Radio. In March 1939, at the invitation of the BBC, Flanagan broadcast the story of the Federal Theatre Project to Britain. Asked to expand the program to encompass the entire WPA, the radio division produced No Help Wanted, a dramatization by William N. Robson with music by Leith Stevens. The Times called it "the best broadcast ever sent us from the Americas".

== Funding pulled by Congress ==
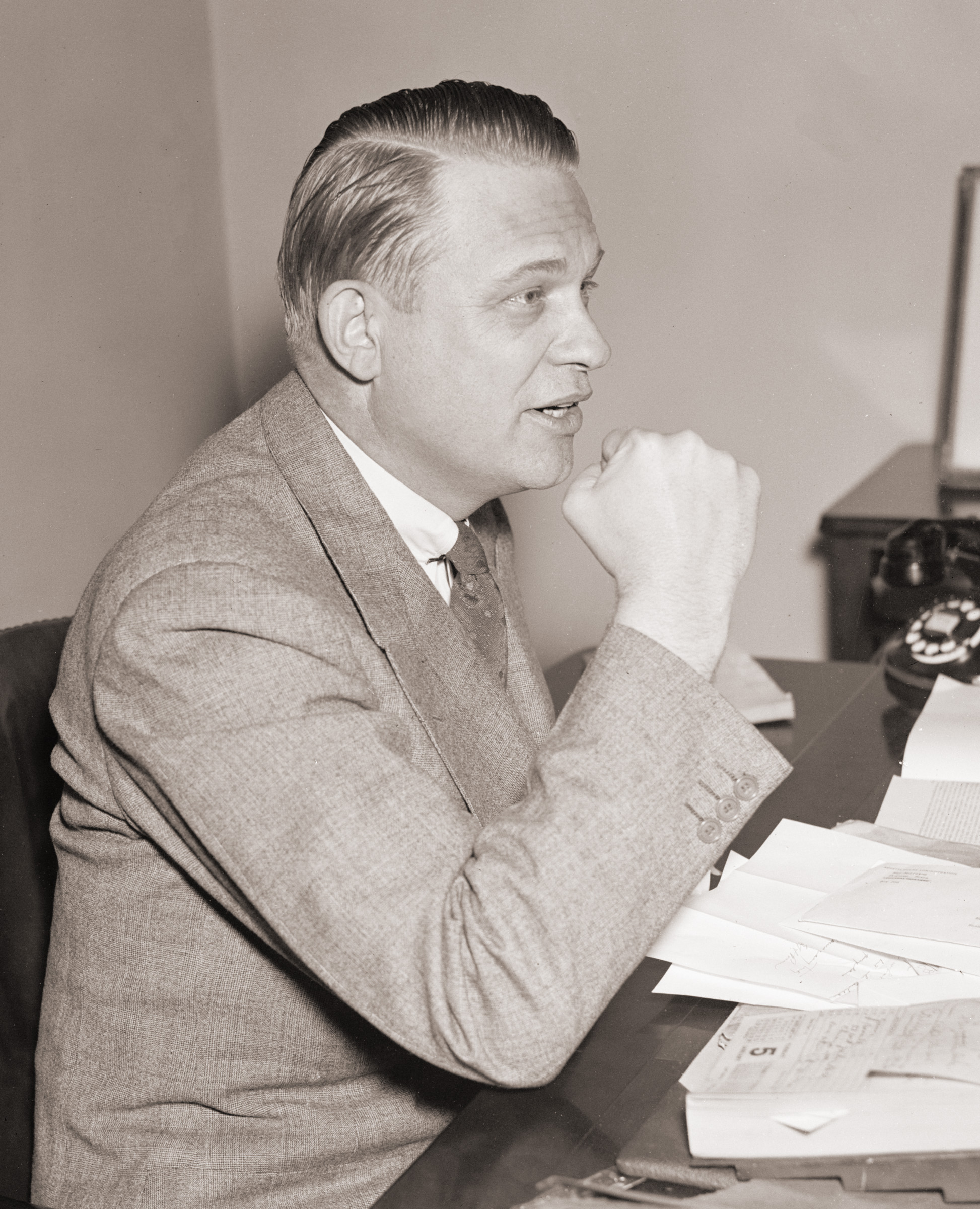
Rep. Martin Dies, Chairman of the House Committee of Un-American Activities, February 17, 1940

In May 1938, Martin Dies Jr., director of The House Committee on Un-American Activities specifically targeted the WPA's Federal Theatre Project. Assailing Flanagan's professional character and political affiliations, the committee heard testimony from former Federal Theatre Project members who were unhappy with their tenure with the project. Flanagan testified that the FTP was pro-American insofar as the work celebrated the constitutional freedoms of speech and expression to address the relevant and pressing concerns of its citizens.

Citing the Federal Theatre's call for racial equality, impending war, and further perpetuating the rumor that the FTP was a front for radical and communist activities, Congress ended federal funding as of June 30, 1939, immediately putting 8,000 people out of work across the country. Although the overall financial cost of the FTP was minuscule in the grand scheme of the WPA's budget, Congress determined that the average American did not consider theater a viable recipient of their tax dollars. Following the decision, Flanagan's stepdaughter, Joanne Bentley quoted an unnamed Congressmen saying "Culture! What the Hell—Let 'em have a pick and shovel!" This decision came as The Cradle Will Rock was set to premiere on Broadway, scuttling the pro-union musical.

Members of Congress criticized a total of 81 of the Federal Theatre Project's 830 major titles for their content in public statements, committee hearings, on the floor of the Senate or House, or in testimony before Congressional committees. Only 29 were original productions of the Federal Theatre Project. The others included 32 revivals or stock productions; seven plays that were initiated by community groups; five that were never produced by the project; two works of Americana; two classics; one children's play; one Italian translation; and one Yiddish play.

The Living Newspapers productions that drew criticism were Injunction Granted, a history of American labor relations; One-Third of a Nation, about housing conditions in New York; Power, about energy from the consumer's point of view; and Triple A Plowed Under, on farming problems in America. Another that was criticized, on the history of medicine, was not completed.

Dramas criticized by Congress were American Holiday, about a small-town murder trial; Around the Corner, a Depression-era comedy; Chalk Dust, about an urban high school; Class of '29, the Depression years as seen through young college graduates; Created Equal, a review of American life since colonial times; It Can't Happen Here, Sinclair Lewis's parable of democracy and dictatorship; No More Peace, Ernst Toller's satire on dictatorships; Professor Mamlock, about Nazi persecution of Jews; Prologue to Glory, about the early life of Abraham Lincoln; The Sun and I, about Joseph in Egypt; and Woman of Destiny, about a female President who works for peace.

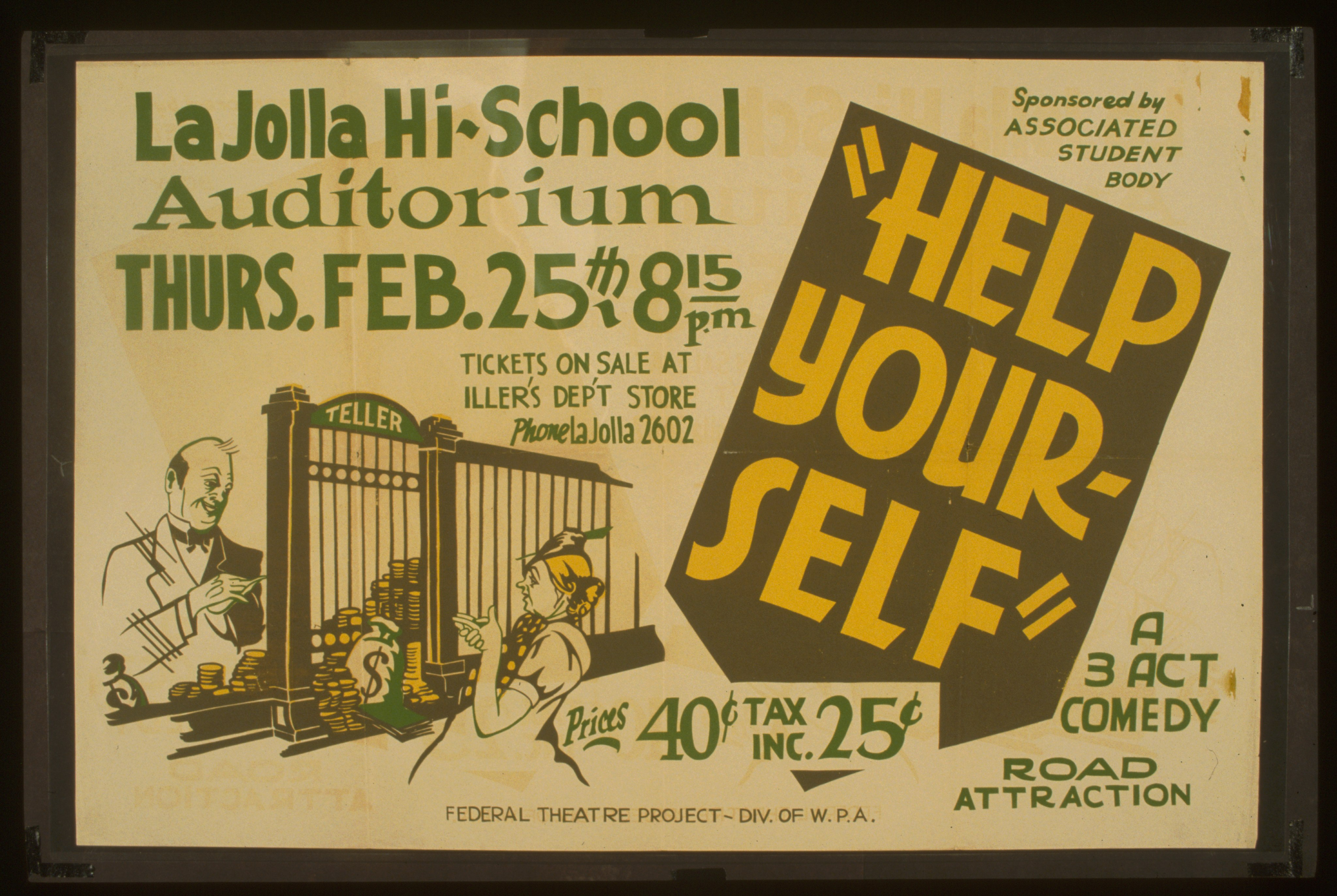
Help Your-Self, La Jolla Hi-School Auditorium, 1937, Paul Vulpius

Negro Theatre Unit productions that drew criticism were The Case of Philip Lawrence, a portrait of life in Harlem; Did Adam Sin?, a review of black folklore with music; and Haiti, a play about Toussaint Louverture.

Also criticized for their content were the dance dramas Candide, from Voltaire; How Long Brethren, featuring songs by future Guggenheim Fellowship recipient Lawrence Gellert; and Trojan Incident, a translation of Euripides with a prologue from Homer.

Help Yourself, a satire on high-pressure business tactics, was among the comedies criticized by Congress. Others were Machine Age, about mass production; On the Rocks by George Bernard Shaw; and The Tailor Becomes a Storekeeper.

Children's plays singled out were Mother Goose Goes to Town, and Revolt of the Beavers, which the New York American called a "pleasing fantasy for children".

The musical Sing for Your Supper also met with Congressional criticism, although its patriotic finale, "Ballad for Americans", was chosen as the theme song of the 1940 Republican National Convention.

== Cultural references ==
A fictionalized view of the Federal Theatre Project is presented in the 1999 film Cradle Will Rock, in which Cherry Jones portrays Hallie Flanagan.
