= Ellery Queen's Mystery Magazine =

American crime fiction magazine

- Nicholas Solovioff painted this cover for a 1955 issue of Ellery Queen's Mystery Magazine. The popularity of the Ellery Queen radio and TV series increased interest in the magazine.
- Categories: Detective fiction, mystery fiction
- Frequency: Bi-monthly
- Founded: 1941; 85 years ago
- Company: Dell Magazines
- Country: United States
- Language: English
- Website: https://www.elleryqueenmysterymagazine.com/
- ISSN: 0013-6328
- OCLC: 1567799

Ellery Queen's Mystery Magazine is a bi-monthly American digest size fiction magazine specializing in crime fiction, particularly detective fiction, and mystery fiction. Launched in fall 1941 by Mercury Press, EQMM is named after the pseudonymous author Ellery Queen, who wrote novels and short stories about a fictional detective also named Ellery Queen. From 1993, EQMM changed its cover title to be Ellery Queen Mystery Magazine (without the "'s"), but the table of contents still retains the full name.

== Background ==
Ellery Queen was the pseudonym of the team of Frederic Dannay and Manfred B. Lee, who had been writing under the name since 1929. EQMM was created to provide a market for mystery fiction above the common run of pulp crime magazines of the day. Dannay served as the magazine's editor-in-chief (although still under the name Ellery Queen) from its creation until his death in 1982, when managing editor Eleanor Sullivan succeeded to the post. Following her death in 1991, Janet Hutchings became editor of EQMM.

In Bloody Murder, Julian Symons offered this description of the publication:

It is... a compendium of every possible kind of crime story. Some of the kinds are more important than others, not all of the stories are masterpieces, and some will madden anybody who has a fixed idea of what the crime short story should be like. Yet the value of the magazine far transcends any criticisms that may be made of it. No doubt short stories would have been written if EQMM had never existed, but they would have been much less various in style and interest, and almost certainly much poorer in quality.

== History ==
=== Mystery League and pre-EQMM era (1933–1934) ===
Around four years after Ellery Queen's successful debut, The Roman Hat Mystery, Dannay and Lee decided to produce a magazine that would publish only quality mystery fiction. Their first attempt, Mystery League, a monthly magazine for mystery fiction, debuted in October 1933, with Dannay and Lee as its only employees. In a time when most of the mystery magazines at the time were digests that would cut long novels into pieces before publishing them, Mystery League published only complete short novels, which helped to maintain the quality of the stories it published while leading to a higher selling price of 25¢. When America was still recovering from the Great Depression, this was too high a price for most people to purchase a magazine. The magazine ceased publication after only four issues, but Ellery Queen's Mystery Magazine took over the basic principle of publishing complete short mystery novels of high quality.

=== Creation (1941) ===
In the fall of 1941, the first issue of Ellery Queen's Mystery Magazine, under the ownership of Lawrence E. Spivak of The Mercury Press, went to press. Dannay assumed primary editorial responsibility for the magazine. The magazine debuted as quarterly, and thanks to its popularity, it went bimonthly in the following year and then monthly in 1946.

Just like "Mystery League", the first issue of EQMM contained seven complete mystery stories from Dashiell Hammett, Margery Allingham, T.S. Stribling, Anthony Abbot, Cornell Woolrich, Fredrick Hazlitt Brennan, and Ellery Queen himself. Dannay admitted in his message to readers that "This first issue is frankly experimental." In sharp contrast to Mystery League's failure, the first issue of EQMM sold more than 90,000 copies, far beyond anyone's expectations. EQMM has become the leading American magazine of the genre and is credited with setting the standard for modern crime and mystery short stories and keeping short stories of the genre alive and flourishing.

=== Frederic Dannay's editorship (1941–1982) ===
Frederic Dannay served as editor-in-chief for EQMM for more than 40 years. As an editor, he aimed to establish a more respectful reputation for mysteries and keep the genre strong. Dannay explained his manifesto for Ellery Queen's Mystery Magazine as being to "raise the sights of mystery writers generally to a genuine literary form," to "encourage good writing among our colleagues by offering a practical market not otherwise available," and to "develop new writers seeking expression in the genre."

To achieve his goal, Dannay worked hard to explore and represent every aspect of mysteries, expanding the variety of materials of EQMM to a great extent, while he believed his efforts also served to cater to the widest possible range of tastes and attract a larger audience. One of his major efforts was to find and publish stories written by big names with elements of crime or mystery, and as a result, more than forty Nobel and Pulitzer Prize winners, including William Faulkner and Ernest Hemingway, had works published in EQMM. Dannay also set a global orientation for EQMM, publishing works from writers all over the world, from works by English writers like Agatha Christie to the first English translation of the work of Argentine writer Jorge Luis Borges. Dannay published the first black detective story ("Corollary" by Hughes Allison) in EQMM in 1948.

The first EQMM short story contest was held in 1946. William Faulkner, the future Nobel Prize winner, wrote a new story for the contest and won second prize, while the first prize went to Manly Wade Wellman. Faulkner was furious about his loss, and in a letter to his agent, he described the contest as "a manufactured mystery story contest." Some contend that the story Faulkner submitted, "An Error in Chemistry," is not among his best. Dannay continued to publish works from Faulkner in EQMM, increasing Faulkner's popularity among the general public.

After the first few years of Dannay reprinted stories he had gathered for his own personal collection of mysteries while slowly adding previously unpublished stories by both famous and unknown authors. EQMM began accepting novels from the general public in 1948. As another effort to expand the variety of materials of the magazines, during Dannay's editorship, the Department of First Stories was established in 1949, which aimed to publish works from new writers and fostering new talent. Dannay himself published more than 500 first stories by first-time writers, and many of them, including Stanley Ellin and David Morrell, grew to become famous writers. In 1953, EQMM bought Black Mask Magazine, and turned it into a special department which "features harder-edged works of crime, noir, and private-eye writers." Black Mask ceased to exist in EQMM in the 1970s, but was reinstated in 2008 and continues to run today.

Crime novelist and stage magician Clayton Rawson was the magazine's managing editor between 1963 and his death in 1971.

Several spin-offs of the magazine came into being and died during this period. Overseas editions for US troops appeared in May 1945 and ceased publication in June 1946 after the end of World War II and the return of US troops. They were almost identical to the normal US edition of EQMM, with the only difference of the title "Special Edition for the Armed Forces Overseas" or "Overseas Edition for the Armed Services" printed on the cover. Since advertisements were not allowed in this kind of publication for the US Army, the opening three pages of this edition, where the ads would typically be, were replaced with an additional story. Otherwise, an additional puzzle would be added at the end as a make-up. An Australian reprint edition started from July 1947 and ceased publication in November 1964, and a UK reprint edition was available between February 1953 and September 1964. Spin-offs that translated the magazine into other languages like Japanese, French, Italian, German were all once available, but all ceased publication eventually.

=== Eleanor Sullivan's editorship (1982–1991) ===
After Frederic Dannay died in 1982, Eleanor Sullivan took his place as editor of EQMM. She was the managing editor from 1970 to 1982, hand-picked by Dannay after an interview. She had written many articles under a pen name for newspapers, magazines and books.

During Sullivan's editorship, in 1985, the EQMM Readers Award began. This is an annual award for the favorite stories of the magazine's readers. It has since become one of the most important awards of its genre. The first EQMM Readers Award went to Clark Howard.

Sullivan also served as editor-in-chief of Alfred Hitchcock's Mystery Magazine from 1975 to 1981, which helped to establish a closer relationship between the two magazines. After Sullivan became editor of EQMM and Cathleen Jordan became the editor of AHMM in 1982, they worked together to keep both magazines prosperous, and often passed stories to each other to find a more suitable place for them.

=== Janet Hutchings' editorship (1991–2025) ===
Janet Hutchings began her career as editor and publisher at the Doubleday Book Clubs, where she was given opportunities to read for the Mystery Guild, to which almost every mystery or crime novel waiting to be published in America would be submitted for possible inclusion. This experience greatly enhanced her passion for mysteries, and later she became Mystery Editor for Walker & Company and published a series of anthologies of stories from Ellery Queen's Mystery Magazine. The connection allowed her to meet Sullivan at the EQMM 50th anniversary party in 1991, and she was later interviewed as a possible successor to the magazine's editor. After Sullivan died in 1991, Hutchings succeeded as editor of EQMM and has held the position since then.

Hutchings inherited Dannay's principle of the magazines, making quality the only standard while trying to maintain a great variety of the genre mysteries and a global focus. She said in an interview that her aim had always been to try to "make EQMM's umbrella as wide as that of the genre", and to publish stories from the broadest possible range of mysteries. In 2003, Hutchings established the Passport to Crime department, which would translate works from other languages on a regular basis. She explained this as the magazine scouting more actively for stories in other languages instead of just waiting for submissions from foreign writers.

During Hutchings' editorship, EQMM embraced the trend of digitalization. In the early 1990s, it converted to desktop publishing, and in 2011 Hutchings admitted that she now read submissions entirely on a Kindle. In 2009, EQMM's podcast series began, which offered audiences audio renditions of stories from the magazine's archives. In the same year, EQMM's first major digital editions became available in addition to the traditional print format. Something Is Going to Happen, the EQMM editor's blog, was launched in 2012, which formed a community where readers can discuss mystery and crime fiction, and where EQMM editors, writers and readers can communicate more directly. The official website of EQMM offered information about the magazines to both subscribers and writers. In January 2018, EQMM launched its first web-only column, "Stranger Than Fiction", on its official website. Written by Dean Jobb and scheduled to be updated monthly for free, the new column studies and presents true crime cases, a topic that EQMM used to lack.

Janet Hutchings' retired as editor of EQMM with the publication of the January/February 2025 issue, which was the 1000th issue of the publication.

=== Jackie Sherbow's editorship (2025–present) ===
Jackie Sherbow, previously the senior managing editor, inherited the editorship on Hutchings's retirement. Soon afterwards, ownership of the magazine passed to Must Read Magazines, a division of Must Read Books Publishing, an imprint of 1 Paragraph.

== Characteristics ==
Ellery Queen's Mystery Magazine has several distinguishing hallmarks, most of which were established during the days of Frederic Dannay's editorship and have been maintained and strengthened since then. It is believed that these characteristics have helped EQMM to survive and flourish for more than 80 years while retaining its reputation as the leading periodical in the genre.

=== Quality ===
From the creation of EQMM, Dannay was determined to make the magazine "a quality publication devoted exclusively to the printing of the best detective-crime short-story literature," making quality the sole criterion for inclusion in the magazine, and this principle was inherited by succeeded editors. The quality of the magazine has been proved by numerous awards won by stories first published on EQMM, and won by the magazine itself. EQMM has been nominated more than 370 times and has won over 110 awards, including awards from those most eminent mystery organisations in the world, including Agatha Awards, Anthony Awards, Arthur Ellis Awards, Barry Awards, Derringer Awards, Edgar Awards, International Thriller Awards, Macavity Awards, Robert L. Fish Awards, Shamus Awards, Spur Awards, and the Ellery Queen Award.

=== Variety ===
EQMM produces a broad range of stories within the mystery genre; including hard-boiled stories, classic English mysteries, noirs, suspense, cozy mysteries and the work of literary writers. With publishing the best as its principle, EQMM has aimed to break down the barrier between supposedly "high" and "low" literary forms while blurring the boundaries of genres.

The variety of the magazine is also reflected in its variety of contributing writers. As Dannay explained, the magazine proposed "to give stories by big-name writers, by lesser-known writers, and by unknown writers. But no matter what their source, they will be superior stories." While the magazine published works by great literary figures, it also started the Department of First Stories in 1949. The magazine has long enjoyed contributions from international writers.

=== Longevity ===
EQMM was one of a relative handful of fiction magazines to survive the decline in American short-fiction publications from the 1950s to the 1970s. It is now the longest-running mystery fiction magazine in existence. Throughout its history it has actively encouraged new writers, and today, when most major publications only accept submissions through literary agents, EQMM still accepts unsolicited submissions through the mail. Writers may also use the online submission manager. The magazine's Department of First Stories has introduced hundreds of new writers, many of whom have become regular contributors.

=== Global orientation ===
EQMM had a global orientation from the beginning. Dannay introduced many international writers, including the Argentine Jorge Luis Borges, to the English literary community. Dannay also ran a number of Worldwide Short Story Contests in the early decades of the magazine, bringing in submissions from all around the world. He published an "All Nations" special issue of EQMM in August 1948, which included stories from every continent but Antarctica. In 2003, current editor Janet Hutchings launched the Passport to Crime department for translations from foreign authors.

== Contents ==
=== Authors ===
EQMM regularly publishes short fiction from established mystery novelists such as Edward D. Hoch, Jeffery Deaver, Michael Gilbert, Peter Lovesey, John Lutz, Ruth Rendell, and Janwillem van de Wetering. It has also published authors not generally considered mystery writers, including A. A. Milne, Stephen King, W. Somerset Maugham, P. G. Wodehouse, Joyce Carol Oates, Theodore Sturgeon, and Phyllis Diller.

=== Sections ===
EQMM regularly publishes two nonfiction sections: The Jury Box contains book reviews by Steve Steinbock and Blog Bytes contains reviews and updates of crime and mystery short fiction blogs by Bill Crider. Twice a year, former Jury Box columnist Jon Breen contributes a guest column.

=== Artists ===
Cover artists have included George Salter, Nicholas Solovioff and Norman Saunders. In 2007–2008, EQMM republished covers from the Golden Age of Detective Fiction.

=== Awards ===
EQMM sponsors the annual Readers Choice Award, voted upon by readers.

=== Series ===
EQMM has always depended heavily on series characters and stories, such as the "Black Widowers" tales of Isaac Asimov, the "Rumpole of the Bailey" stories of John Mortimer, and the "Ganelon" stories of James Powell. Foremost among series authors was the late Edward D. Hoch, who created at least a dozen independent series for EQMM since his first story appeared in 1962. From May 1973 to May 2007, he had at least one original story in every issue of EQMM, a string that reached an unparalleled 34 years; in that same period he published about fifty stories in EQMM's sister publication, Alfred Hitchcock's Mystery Magazine.

== Publishing information ==
=== Editors ===
- 1941–1982, Frederic Dannay
- 1982–1991, Eleanor Sullivan
- 1991–2025, Janet Hutchings
- 2025–present, Jackie Sherbow

=== Publisher ===
- Mercury Publications (1941–1958)
- Davis Publications (1958–1992)
- Dell Magazines (1992–1996) - owned by Dell Publishing
- Dell Magazines (1996–2025) - owned by Penny Publications
- 1 Paragraph, Inc. (2025–present) - Has also purchased Alfred Hitchcock's Mystery Magazine, Analog Science Fiction and Fact, and Asimov's Science Fiction, from Penny, and The Magazine of Fantasy & Science Fiction from Spilogale, Inc.

== Annual awards ==
- EQMM Readers Choice Awards, annual, voted upon by readers
- Ellery Queen Award, annual, honors writing teams
- EQMM Contest for short stories, 1946–57, 1962

== Other languages ==
The magazine had an official Spanish version, Selecciones policiacas y de misterio, edited by the Mexican Antonio Helú.
