= Emergency Relief Appropriation Act of 1935 =

Act of the United States Congress

- Long title: JOINT RESOLUTION Making appropriations for relief purposes
- Enacted by: the 74th United States Congress

Citations
- Statutes at Large: 49 Stat. 115

Legislative history
- Introduced in the House as H.J. Res. 117; Signed into law by President Franklin D. Roosevelt on April 8, 1935

The Relief Appropriation Act of 1935 was passed on April 8, 1935, as a part of Franklin Delano Roosevelt's New Deal. It was a large public works program that included the Works Progress Administration (WPA), the National Youth Administration, the Resettlement Administration, the Rural Electrification Administration, and other assistance programs. These programs were called the "second New Deal". The programs gave Americans work, for which the government would pay them. The goal was to help unemployment, pull the country out of the Great Depression, and prevent another depression in the future. This was the first and largest system of public-assistance relief programs in American history, and it led to the largest accumulation of national debt.

== Background ==
Before 1935, many programs focused on direct aid and "the dole". Franklin Delano Roosevelt did not like providing welfare to able workers as it demoralized the unemployed and created dependency on the government, and even the unemployed preferred work relief. He was also concerned about "future problems of unemployment and unprotected old age" and believed that "we have to get it started, or it will never start". At the beginning of 1935, 11.3 million Americans were unemployed, which was nearly 22% of the civilian labor force.

In January 1935, Roosevelt announced his plans to alter the current relief programs.

The Federal Government must and shall quit this business of relief. I am not willing that the vitality of our people be further sapped by the giving of cash, of market baskets, of a few hours of weekly work cutting grass, raking leaves or picking up papers in public parks. We must preserve not only the bodies of the unemployed from destruction but also their self-respect, their self-reliance and courage and determination.

On April 8, 1935, Roosevelt introduced the Emergency Relief Appropriation Act, which only gave direct aid to people who were unable to work, such as the elderly and the disabled. Despite the word "emergency", this act was created to address a long-term problem.

He asked Congress for $4.88 billion – two thirds would go to finance work relief, and the rest would end the Federal Emergency Relief Administration, the work program created by Roosevelt in 1933 which replaced the Civil Works Administration.

He asked for $4 billion to get things going, and $880 million was reallocated from previous appropriations to aid 3.5 million people. The local governments and agencies had already cared for the 1.5 million unemployable relief recipients (e.g. the ill, the aged, the physically handicapped). Of the funds appropriated by the act, $27 million was approved for the Federal Art Project, the Federal Writers' Project and the Federal Theatre Project under the WPA sponsored Federal Project Number One.

== Collapse ==
By September 1935, the program was failing and looked to some like it might even collapse. There was only $1 billion left, and less than ¼ of the estimated 3.5 million people were employed.

There had been many obstacles that led to its downfall, such as:

- The bill was delayed in Congress because people demanded that the program pay wages at existing levels
- Congressional leaders wanted to allocate the funds to specific categories and agencies, making it difficult to have a smooth transition from the existing program
- Conflict between Harry Hopkins and Harold Ickes – they argued on whether the program should be public works (expensive projects with less relief labor) or work relief ("made work")

== Results ==
Roosevelt had hoped that this would end the Depression and create jobs, but it was unsuccessful. He gave the rest of the appropriation to Harry Hopkins, who had created the WPA.

Congress contributed to this program throughout the 1930s, but beginning in 1939, funds were reduced. Many programs were discontinued over the years, and in 1943, Congress ended many of the Emergency Relief Appropriation Act programs, including WPA and PWA. Unemployment was no longer a major issue because WWII had created thousands of jobs.

Many people complained that "the programs created 'busy work' for the unemployed at the expense of the nation's more affluent citizens." The Rural Electrification Administration, however, was successful. In 1934, only 11% of American farms had electricity, but that rose to 50% by 1942 and almost 100% by the end of the 1940s. The WPA built and renovated thousands of schools, hospitals, and playgrounds.
