= Hughes Allison =

African American author of fiction

- Born: March 29, 1908; Greenville, North Carolina
- Died: August 26, 1974; Newark, NJ

Hughes Allison (1908–1974), was an African American author, playwright, and journalist.

== Early life ==
Hughes Allison was born in North Carolina and moved to Newark with his family in 1919. His father was in life insurance, and his mother was a teacher. He attended Bergen Street Grammar School, Barringer High School, and Upsala College. He was married to Elitea ("Lee") Bulkley, a librarian, in 1919.

== Published works ==
Allison's first published story was in Challenge Magazine in 1935. He regularly contributed to Ellery Queen's Mystery Magazine and True Story; he was the first African American to have a short story published in Ellery Queen's Mystery Magazine with the story Corollary. His most famous character in his mysteries was African American detective Joe Hill, who Allison said was "equipped to think with his skin". Some of his mystery stories featured characters inspired by real Newark policemen.

Allison wrote the 1937 Broadway play "The Trial of Dr. Beck," which was originally produced by the Federal Theatre. The Brooklyn Daily Eagle wrote, "[it] is a vigorous and entertaining sample of its kind". The New York Daily News called it a "well-written, well-acted drama" and said "when the Federal Theatre Project can present an evening's entertainment of this type for 55 cents, the Broadway producers better look to their box offices".

Allison also wrote "It's Midnight Over Newark", which was produced by the Mosque Theatre (now Symphony Hall) in 1941. The play centered around the lack of African-American doctors and nurses in Newark hospitals.

Allison also wrote over 2,000 radio scripts. In the 1950s, he wrote a series of articles on school segregation for the Newark Evening News, which inspired court cases by the federal government.

== Later life ==
The home of Allison and his wife, at 15 Wallace St in Newark, was threatened in the 1970s by urban renewal, when the entire neighborhood was slated for demolition. Though the Allisons protested the decision, they were unsuccessful and the house was demolished. In his later years his writing was limited due to failing health and he died in 1974.

Allison's papers are held at the Newark Public Library.
