= Federal Project Number One =

Projects under the U.S. WPA New Deal program

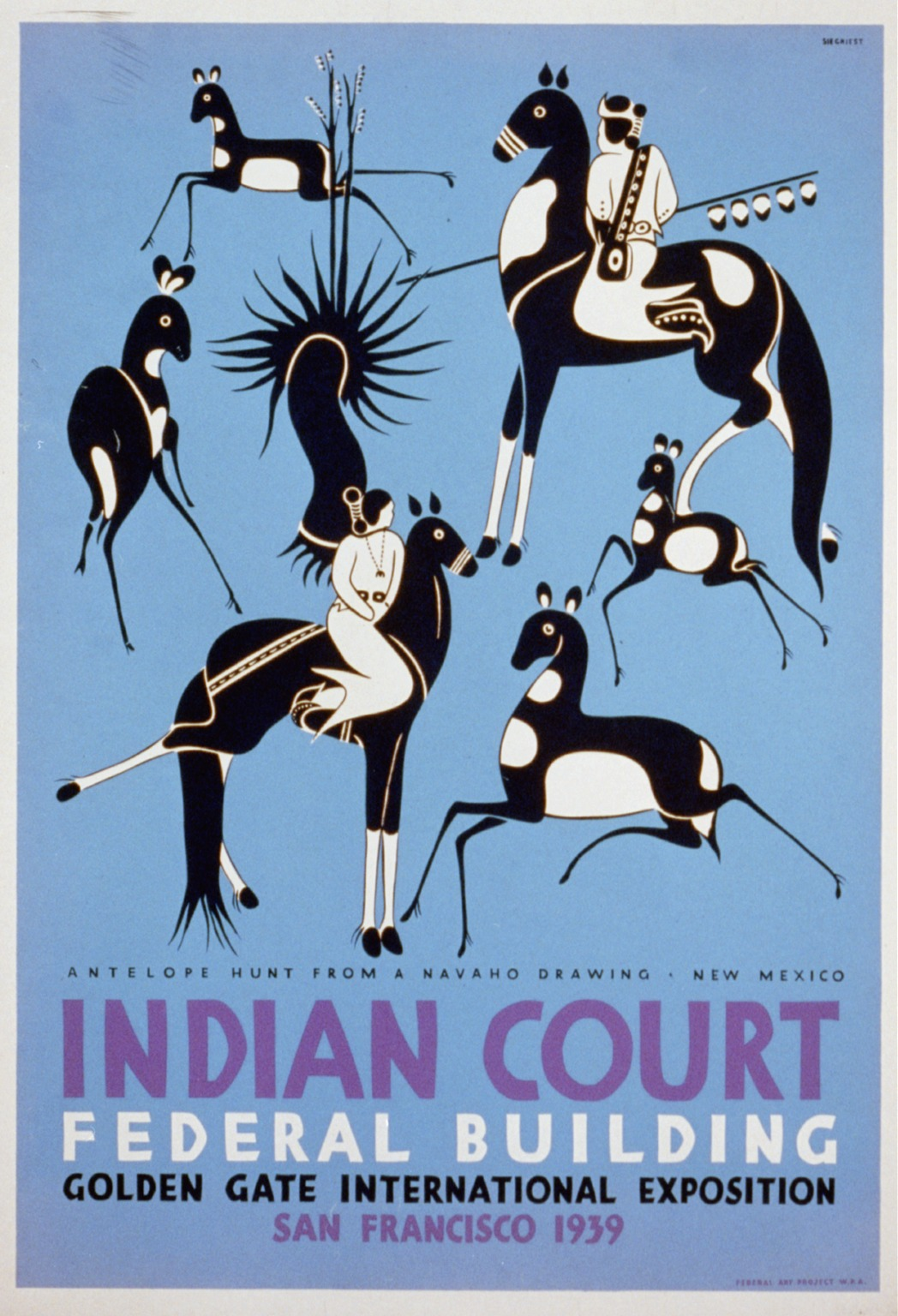
WPA Poster

Federal Project Number One, also referred to as Federal One (Fed One), is the collective name for a group of projects under the Works Progress Administration, a New Deal program in the United States. Of the $4.88 billion allocated by the Emergency Relief Appropriation Act of 1935, $27 million was approved for the employment of artists, musicians, actors and writers under the WPA's Federal Project Number One. In its prime, Federal Project Number One employed up to 40,000 writers, musicians, artists and actors because, as Secretary of Commerce Harry Hopkins put it, "Hell, they’ve got to eat, too". This project had two main principles: 1) that in time of need the artist, no less than the manual worker, is entitled to employment as an artist at the public expense and 2) that the arts, no less than business, agriculture, and labor, are and should be the immediate concern of the ideal commonwealth.

The five divisions of Federal One were these:

- Federal Art Project
- Federal Music Project
- Federal Theatre Project
- Federal Writers' Project
- Historical Records Survey (originally part of the Federal Writers' Project)

All projects were supposed to operate without discrimination regarding race, creed, color, religion, or political affiliation.

Federal Project Number One ended in 1939 when, under pressure from Congress, the theater project was cancelled and the other projects were required to rely on state funding and local sponsorship.

== Controversy ==
Many people were opposed to government involvement in the arts. They feared that government funding and influence would lead to censorship and a violation of freedom of speech. Members of the House Un-American Activities Committee believed the program to be infiltrated by communists.

However, with support from Eleanor Roosevelt, Franklin Roosevelt signed the executive order to create this project because the government wanted to support, as Fortune magazine stated, “the kind of raw cultural material—the raw material of new creative work—which is so necessary to artists and particularly to artists in a new country.”

Most of the newspapers and magazines in America were Republican and anti-Roosevelt, and they made what capital they could out of traditional American Philistinism. The Art Projects were scorned as "boondoggling." Under this constant and relentless attack it was necessary to develop work projects that could be defended as "worthwhile." For the project to have sent every artist home to paint his own pictures his own way without supervision or accountability would have invited disaster. Mural projects were a little less liable to charges of boondoggling than easel painting. They were relatively public and subject to scrutiny and criticism.

— Edward Laning, “When Uncle Sam Played Patron of the Arts: Memoirs of a WPA Painter”

== Legacy ==
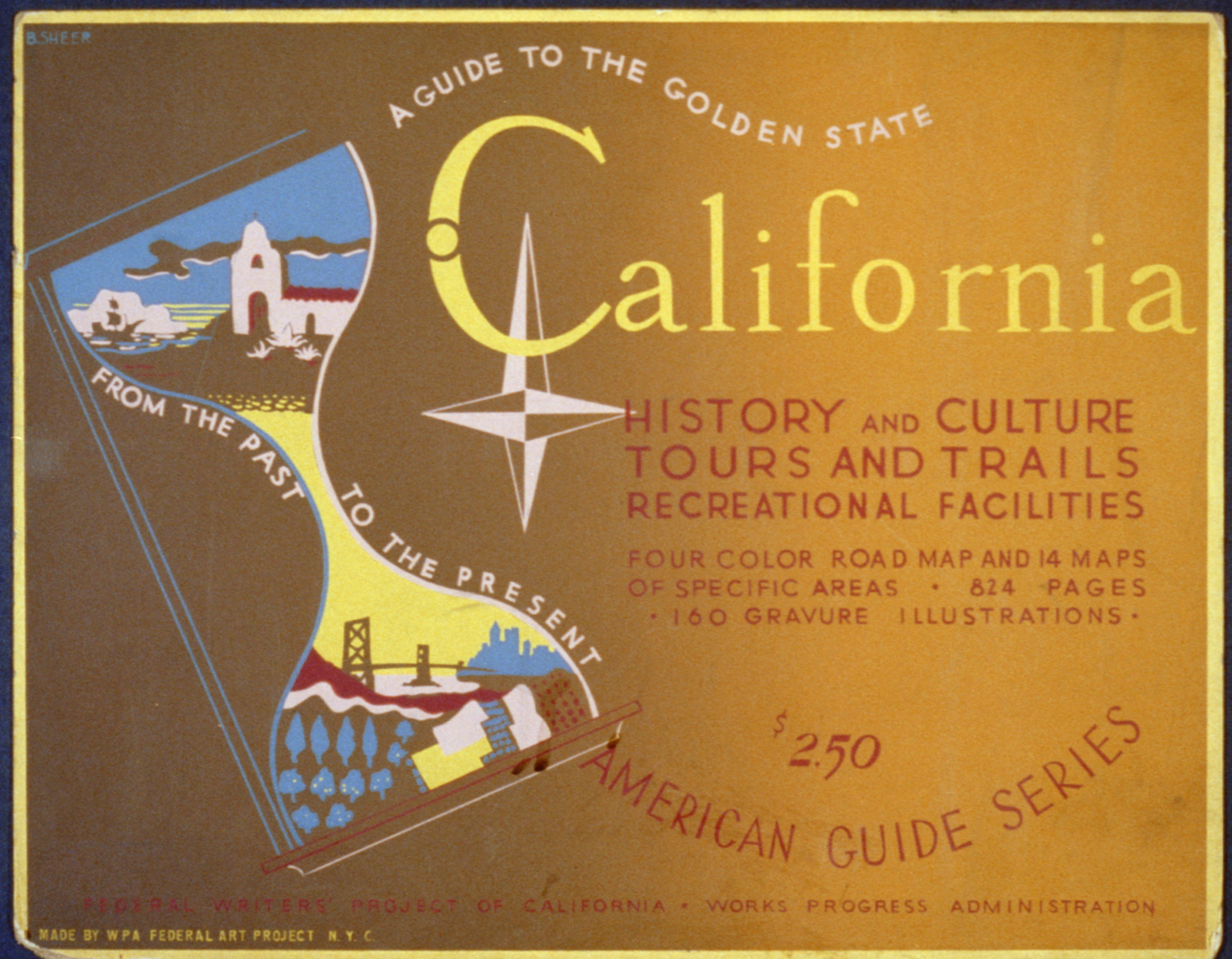
An example of one of the Federal Writers' Project's books

At its peak Federal One employed 40,000 writers, musicians, artists and actors and the Federal Writers' project had around 6,500 people on the WPA payroll. Many people benefitted from these programs and some FWP writers became famous, such as John Steinbeck and Zora Neale Hurston. These writers were considered to be federal writers. Furthermore, these projects also published books such as New York Panorama and the WPA Guide to New York City.

== See also ==
- Mathematical Tables Project
- Harry Hopkins
- New Deal
