= Nicholas Solovioff =

American artist

Nicholas Solovioff (1927–1994) was an American artist.

Solovioff was a prolific illustrator, having done covers for The Magazine of Fantasy & Science Fiction, Fortune, Sports Illustrated, Horizon, Reader's Digest and the Smithsonian Institution. He also illustrated articles in Fortune and illustrated some of the Time-Life books. He specialized in illustrating architecture, technology, science and nature. In addition to illustrations for magazines, he did technical illustration for government contracted technical manuals and architectural proposals for Philip Johnson and Skidmore, Owings and Merrill. He was the artist in residence for the Port of New York Authority. He was known for his work featuring the bar at Oscar's Delmonico also known as Delmonico's. He was commissioned by NASA in the 1960s to document the Apollo program.

Solovioff was educated at Harvard University, where he began studying astronomy, physics and math, but he eventually switched to art history. After obtaining a BA, he got an MFA from Harvard and all but completed a Ph.D. as well. He taught art history, drawing, painting and sculpture at the Fogg Museum of Art while working towards a Ph.D. He also taught at the Parsons School of Design. Solovioff served in World War II in the United States Army and later as a combat artist for the United States Marine Corps in Vietnam.
