= Federal Music Project =

U.S. New Deal program

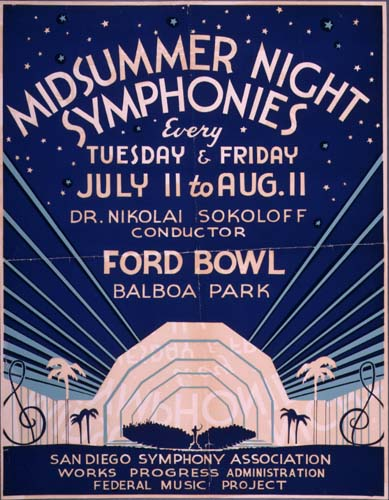
"Midsummer Night Symphonies", Southern California Federal Music Project, WPA, ca. 1937

The Federal Music Project (FMP) was a part of the New Deal program Federal Project Number One provided by the U.S. federal government which employed musicians, conductors and composers during the Great Depression. In addition to performing thousands of concerts, offering music classes, organizing the Composers Forum Laboratory, hosting music festivals and creating 34 new orchestras, employees of the FMP researched American traditional music and folk songs, a practice now called ethnomusicology. In the latter domain the Federal Music Project did notable studies on cowboy, Creole, and what was then termed Negro music. During the Great Depression, many people visited these symphonies to forget about the economic hardship of the time. In 1939, the FMP transitioned to the Works Progress Administration's Music Program, which along with many other WPA projects, was phased out in the midst of World War II.

== Background ==
In the grips of the Great Depression, President Franklin D. Roosevelt proposed to sharply increase public projects in order to raise employment. This overarching strategy was known as the New Deal. Roosevelt realized the importance of the arts in American culture, stating that the "American Dream… was the promise not only of economic and social justice but also of cultural enrichment." In July 1935 a New Deal program known as Federal One was created. This included five arts projects, including the FMP. This project was the first where Federal money was used on culture.

The Depression had compounded a downturn in the fortunes of American musicians. At the same time musicians were also being affected by advances in technology. Sound recordings were beginning to replace live musicians at functions and events.

== Leadership ==
Dr. Nikolai Sokoloff was the director of the Federal Music Project. Before the Federal Music Project, Dr. Sokoloff was the conductor for the original Cleveland Orchestra from 1919-1933. Sokoloff appointed a staff of five Regional Directors, twenty-three State Directors, and five administrative staff. In 1936, the Works Progress Administration also began to add on to the Federal Music Project. The WPA didn't center towards original music. The next year Charles Seeger developed into assistant director of the project. After he became assistant director, many varieties of music became available. Seeger's ambition was for everyone to take an interest in music, and become a part of it.

== Objectives ==
The primary objective of the FMP was to employ professional musicians from all over the country to perform as instrumentalists, singers, and concert actors. As a result of the growing number of performing groups, there was also a need for music copyists and binders. Men and women were hired to copy existing music by hand and then to bind them, distributing musical arrangements to ensembles around the nation. The Project also aimed to inspire music appreciation by enabling access to live performances and by introducing music instruction in the classroom. Finally, the FMP sought to document musical activity in the United States.

Even though the project was thought to be this picturesque, ideal, and perfect plan, there were still many challenging facets that occurred during its time. One of the more general obstacles the Federal Music Project had to go through was the types of culture going into the project. Sokoloff was predisposed to European classical music, and made that the focus of the FMP. There was a much lower priority placed on vernacular or American folk music. These Eurocentric tastes were in contrast to the "common man" ideology of the New Deal. Despite this national focus on classical music, regional and local implementations of the FMP revealed the diverse musical genres in early 20th century America. Live performances of African American and Hispanic music drew attention, as did efforts in several states to document musical traditions from ethnic minorities, spirituals, work songs and other folk music.

== State-level implementation ==
The Federal Music Program was particularly successful in New Mexico. Helen Chandler Ryan served as the FMP state music director from January 1936 until the project's end in 1943. She adapted the national program to meet the special musical interests of her sparsely populated state. She decided to devote much of the program to solo instruction in rural communities. Another concentration was the study of the diverse regional musical style created by blending European, Native American and Spanish American music. New Mexico's implementation of the Federal Music Program received praise for its diversity.

== Project successes ==
The Federal Music Project created lessons for adults who were underprivileged, and it created a musical program for children. The creation of music was more popular, and the appreciation for music arose. The amateur musicians became better, and there were more musical participants. The project formed new orchestras, singers, dancers, vocal groups, and vocal producers. The music project supplied performers and teachers of music an occupation. It also created many new orchestral pieces of music. The project caught on so much in the 1930s that most schools had their own music program. In addition, it created something for people to do during the hardships. These musical concerts were either a very low cost, or they were free, allowing many who could otherwise not afford such luxury to attend.

== Decline and termination ==
In 1939, the Federal Music Project's budget was cut. This was followed by the decline in finances for other New Deal programs as well; many other projects like the Federal Music Project saw their funding reduced. Congressional support deteriorated in the late 1930s, and the budget bill passed in June 1939 reflected the reduced support. Sokoloff had resigned the previous month amid debate over his preference toward classical music. And in 1939 the Federal Music Project was renamed. Its new name was the WPA Music Program. Though a year later the Federal Music Project/WPA Music Program would be terminated. State music projects came to an end with the ending of the WPA on June 30, 1943.

== See also ==
- Elmer Keeton (1882–1947)
