= Lee Wainer =

Lee Wainer (March 28, 1904 – November 11, 1979) was an American composer, songwriter, screen writer, lawyer, actor and television producer. A native of Philadelphia, he studied law at University of Pennsylvania and worked as a lawyer prior to having a career as a composer and songwriter in New York during the 1930s and 1940s. While working for the Federal Theatre Project as a writer of incidental music on a series of Broadway plays in the 1930s he studied music at Columbia University. He wrote the scores to two Broadway revues: Sing for Your Supper (1939) and New Faces of 1943. After World War II, he relocated to Los Angeles where he had a career as primarily a screenwriter and television producer. He also occasionally acted in minor parts on screen.

== Early life and marriages ==
The son of Morris and Anna Wainer, Lee Wainer was born on March 28, 1904 in Philadelphia. He studied piano and music theory with Albert Meller and the organ with Nathaniel Watson. In 1930 he graduated with a Bachelor of Laws from the University of Pennsylvania. By February 1931 he was working as a pianist at the Ambassador Hotel in Palm Beach, Florida in a show led by Art Barnett. After this he returned to Philadelphia where he worked as a lawyer. In June 1933 he married Naomi Nachamson. They separated in 1934 and divorced in 1936. He later married Rita Carroll in Manhattan on October 13, 1940; a marriage which lasted until his death nearly 40 years later.

== New York composer and songwriter ==
Wainer relocated to New York City where he worked as a composer of incidental music for shows produced by the Shubert family during the 1930s. There he studied music at Columbia University; ultimately graduating with an M.A. in music in 1937. He composed the music to two songs written in collaboration with lyricists Lupin Fein and Moe Jaffe that were interpolated into the 1932 Broadway musical A Little Racketeer: "Mr. Moon" and "Spring Tra La". He wrote the music to two of the Federal Theatre Project's Living Newspaper plays stage at the Biltmore Theatre on Broadway in 1936: Triple-A Plowed Under and 1935. This was followed by further music for two Living Newspaper plays by Arthur Arent: Power which was first staged at the Ritz Theatre in 1937, and One-Third of a Nation which played at the Adelphi Theatre in 1938.

With lyricist Lupin Fein, Wainer authored the song "Strike Me Blue" which was included in Irving Mills and Duke Ellington's 1937 revue at the Cotton Club featuring Ethel Waters. That same year his song "Don't Know If I'm Comin' or Goin'", also written with Fein, was recorded by Billie Holiday. His song with lyricist John La Touche, "The Great White Way Turns Pink" was interpolated into the revue Pins and Needles midway through its run beginning in October 1938. With Ned Lehac he co-wrote the music to the Broadway musical revue Sing for Your Supper which ran at the Adelphi Theatre in 1939. With lyricist Robert Sour he composed two songs for the original production of Sylvia Regan's Morning Star: "We'll Bring the Rux de la Paix Back to Old Broadway" and "Under a Painted Smile". This play ran on Broadway at the Longacre Theatre in 1940.

By the summer of 1940, Wainer was working as a composer with Broadcast Music, Inc.. Fredda Gibson (later known as Georgia Gibbs) performed his song "Story of a Song" (lyrics by R. Sour) on radio broadcasts in 1941. That same year he served as music director for Princeton University's "Triangle Show". He subsequently composed the music to the Broadway musical revue New Faces of 1943 which played at the Ritz Theatre in the 1942-1943 Broadway season. In the summer of 1943 he worked as the music director at the Tamiment Playhouse. With Ervin Drake he co-wrote the score to a Spring 1944 revue starring Perry Como at the Versailles nightclub that was led by music director Ray Sinatra.

== Later career in.Hollywood ==
After World War II, Wainer transitioned into a career in Hollywood. With June Carroll, Wainer co-authored the story to 1945 film An Angel Comes to Brooklyn which was made by Republic Pictures. He was a contributing writer to the screenplay for Kilroy Was Here (1947), and he authored the screenplay to the 1950 Lippert Pictures film Holiday Rhythm. He wrote songs used in the Roy Rogers film South of Caliente, and was also active as a writer for radio and television specials. During the 1950s he worked as a producer for The Pinky Lee Show. He also did some minor on-screen acting work; including the role of Cane in Devil's Angels (1967). He was a member of the American Society of Composers, Authors and Publishers.

Wainer died on November 11, 1979 in Los Angeles.
