= Power (Arent) =

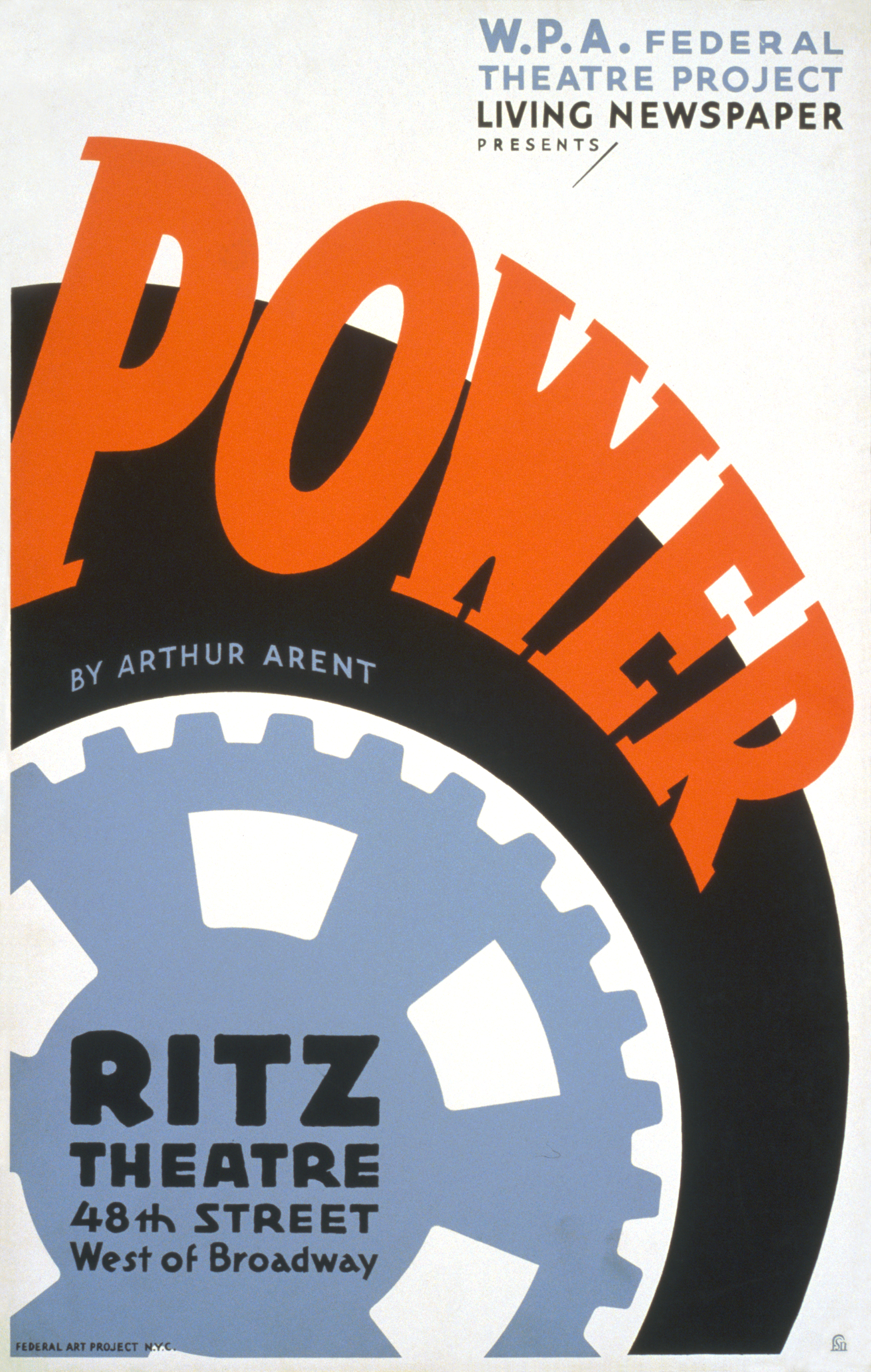
Poster for the Broadway production of Power.

Power is a play by Arthur Arent. It includes incidental music by composer Lee Wainer. It premiered at the Ritz Theatre on Broadway on February 23, 1937. It ran there for a total of 118 performances. The play was mounted by the Federal Theatre Project as part of its Living Newspaper series, and the ideas expressed in the play was clearly in support of the policies of the New Deal and the Works Progress Administration. The cast included Charles Dill as the Announcer, Norman Lloyd as the Consumer, Burton Mallory as Senator Norris, H. H. McCollum as Samuel Insull, and Allan Tower as the Electric Co. Manager.
