= One Third of a Nation =

1939 painting by O. Louis Guglielmi

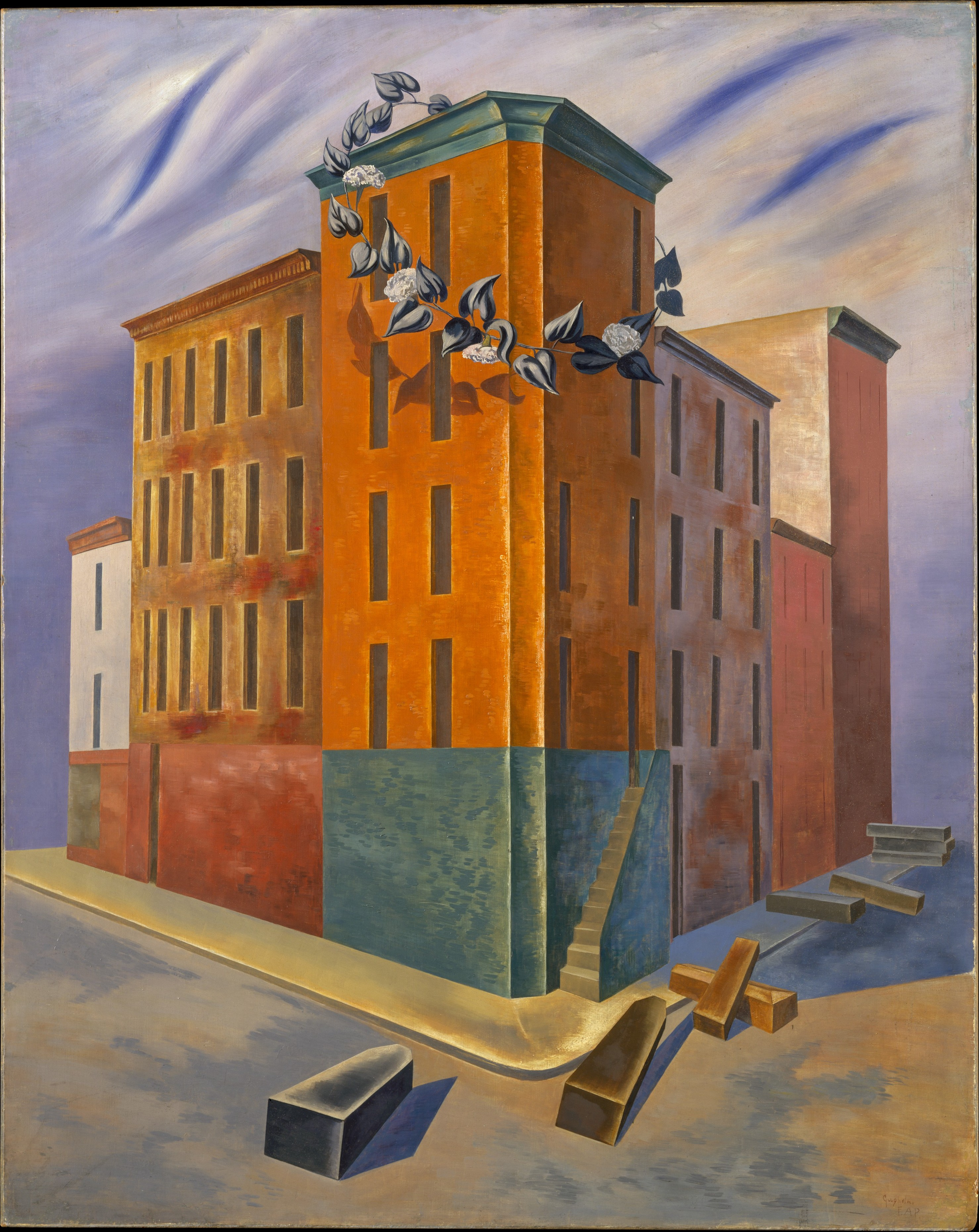
- Artist: O. Louis Guglielmi
- Year: 1939
- Medium: Oil and tempera on wood
- Dimensions: 76.2 cm × 61 cm (30.0 in × 24 in)
- Location: Metropolitan Museum of Art; New York City
- Accession: 43.47.10

"One Third of a Nation" is a 1939 painting by American artist O. Louis Guglielmi. Done in oil and tempera on wood, the painting depicts an impoverished apartment block. Guglielmi's work is filled with imagery detailing the poor quality of life during the Great Depression; the buildings seen in the painting are run down, and coffin-like shapes are strewn in the deserted street.

The painting shares a title with One-Third of a Nation, a 1938 play intended to draw attention to poor Americans during the Great Depression, and with President Franklin D. Roosevelt's inaugural address at the start of his second term.
