= One-Third of a Nation =

Play by Arthur Arent written in 1938

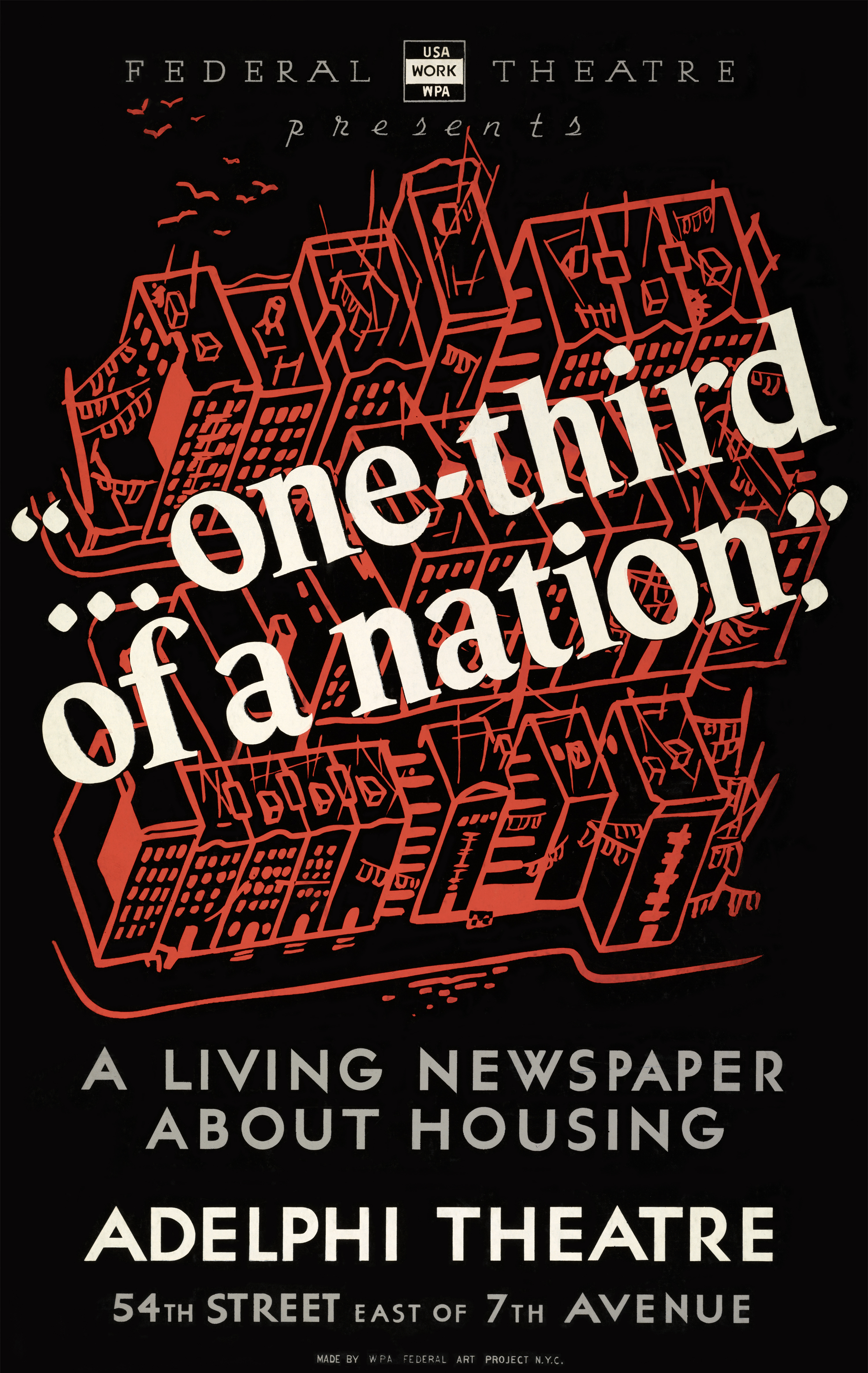
Poster for the 1938 New York production of One-Third of a Nation

One Third of a Nation is a Living Newspaper play produced by the Federal Theatre Project in 1938. Written by Arthur Arent from research by the editorial staff of the Federal Theatre Project, it focused on the problem of housing in the United States and the growth of slums in New York City. The play was produced in New York and in nine additional cities, where it was adapted to specific community conditions. It was adapted as a feature film in 1939 and revived on the New York stage in 2011.

== Plot ==
I see one-third of a nation ill-housed, ill-clad, ill-nourished...The test of our progress is not whether we add more to the abundance of those who have much; it is whether we provide enough for those who have too little.

— Second inaugural address of President Franklin D. Roosevelt, January 20, 1937

One-Third of a Nation opens with a scene depicting a burning tenement in New York. The Voice of the Living Newspaper pairs with a character named Angus Buttonkooper, "the little man", and they both try to explain why decent housing is not available in New York. They conclude that corruption in the New York housing department is a major obstacle.

With the expansion of the city, a rich landlord is depicted sitting on a patch of grass, which portrays his property. As the population of the city expands, more and more people try and fit on that patch of grass. They resort to petty fighting and theft. Slowly but steadily, the Buttonkooper gets politicized as he wanders through 100 years of corruption and troubles; he sees the polarity between wealthy landlords and their impoverished tenants.

The piece ends with the delineation of the failure of the Housing Act of 1937, a $565 million project that only managed to alleviate about two percent of New York's slums. The Little Man and his wife vow to continue activism against the government until "everyone in America has a decent place to live in."

One-Third of a Nation employs the allegorical concept of the little man. He is an impoverished person with little access to resources, always suppressed by landlords. The little man emerges as the protagonist, central to the Living Newspaper's aim at providing social commentary. Their plays also featured direct communication with the audience.

== Production ==
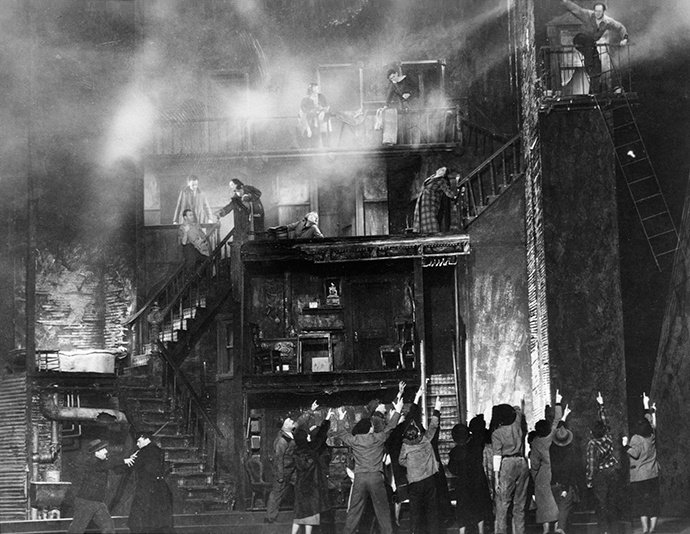
Howard Bay's set and the fatal fire in the tenement that begins One-Third of a Nation

Written by Arthur Arent from research done by staff at the Federal Theatre Project, the senators' speeches in the play were taken from the Congressional Record. One-Third of a Nation was first presented January 17 – October 22, 1938, at the Adelphi Theatre in New York. One of the greatest successes of the New York City Federal Theatre Project, it was seen by more than 217,000 people in that city alone.

Designed by Howard Bay, the New York production filled the stage with a huge cross-section of a slum; real fires burned on the stage.

Adapted to match specific local housing conditions, the play was presented in nine additional cities including Cincinnati, Detroit, Hartford, Philadelphia, Portland, Washington DC, and Seattle. One-Third of a Nation was presented daily at the Golden Gate International Exposition and was still running in San Francisco when the Federal Theatre Project ended July 1, 1939. In 1943, a version adapted to wartime conditions in London using Mass-Observation techniques was staged at the Unity Theatre.

== Reception ==
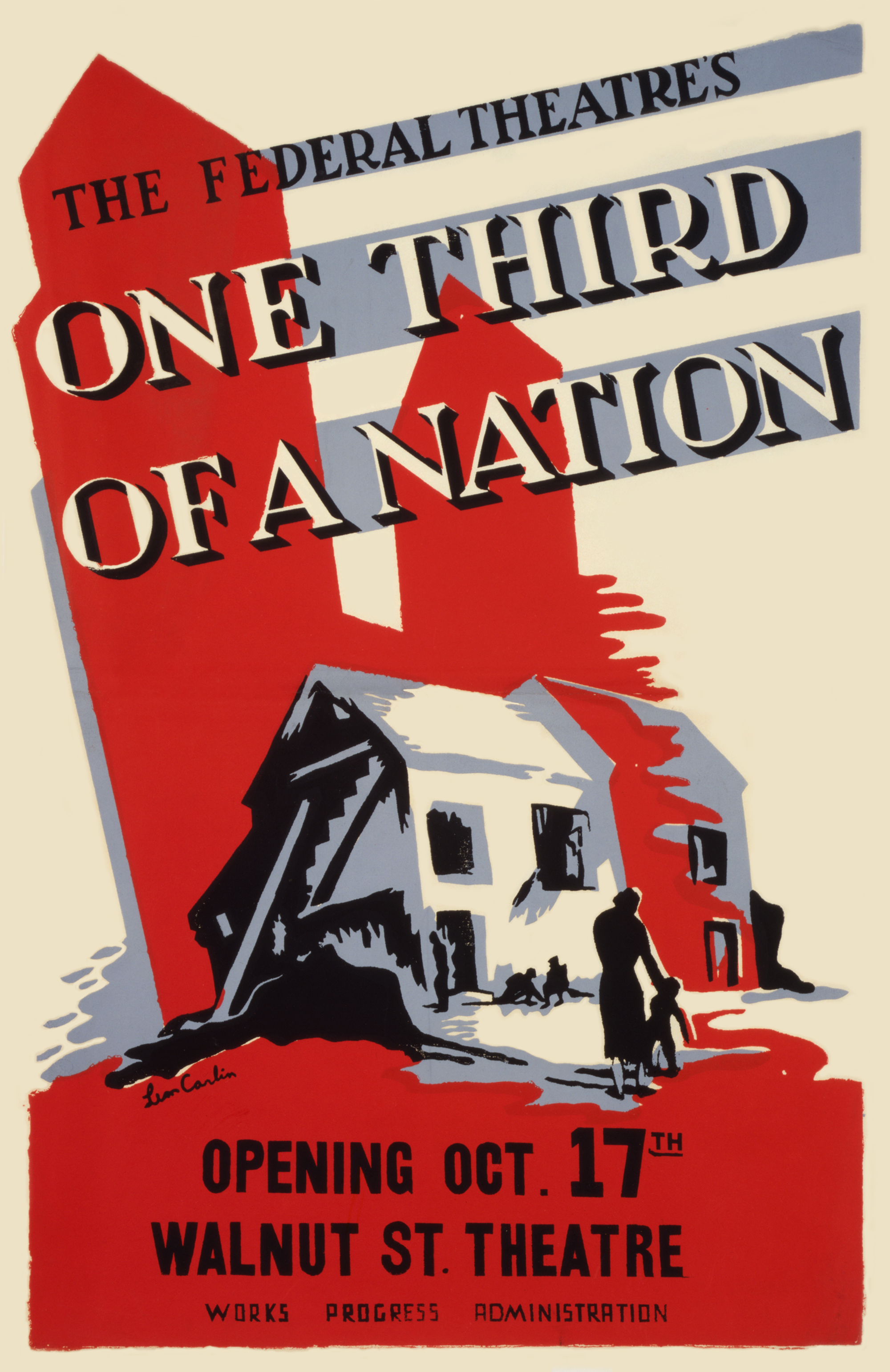
Poster for the 1938 Philadelphia production of One-Third of a Nation at the Walnut Street Theatre

"The press throughout the country considered One-Third of a Nation the most important contribution to date," wrote Federal Theatre Project national director Hallie Flanagan.

The first success of the New Orleans Federal Theatre, One-Third of a Nation was praised by The Times-Picayune for being "as timely and shrewdly staged theatrical entertainment as has been witnessed in New Orleans for many a season." The New Orleans Item called it "a dramatic bombshell ... a startled initiation into the roaring effectiveness of a new stage medium."

The Cincinnati Post called it "one of those rare things in the theatre: a play which makes an important subject tremendously exciting." The Oregon Journal described it as "topical, rapidly paced, and brilliantly experimental." In Detroit the play was held over for four weeks. "The worst thing about One-Third of a Nation is that it is true," wrote The Detroit News, which praised its "unforgettable vividness and compelling power...thrilling beyond description...a rare experience in the theatre — not to be missed by anyone."

While withholding praise during the nine-week run of One-Third of a Nation in Seattle, The Seattle Times reported "Seldom has any play so caught the public fancy." A Philadelphia reviewer criticized the number of people in the cast — missing the point that employment was the reason the Federal Theatre existed — but still granted that the production "frequently smacks you between the eyes with its dramatic force. If you're interested in stagecraft or housing, it's an experiment worth your money."

=== Criticism in Congress ===
"One-Third of a Nation, like any powerful play on a controversial subject, made enemies as well as friends," wrote Flanagan. "Enemies made by the living newspaper were, I believe, powerful enemies, instrumental in the final closing of the project."

One-Third of a Nation was one of the Federal Theatre Project productions criticized by conservatives in Congress. Funding for the Federal Theatre Project was terminated in 1939 after strong Congressional objections to the left-wing political tone of less than 10 percent of its productions.

== Adaptations ==
One-Third of a Nation was adapted for a 1939 film released by Paramount Pictures, produced and directed by Dudley Murphy. The cast includes Sylvia Sidney, Leif Erickson, Myron McCormick, Hiram Sherman, and 15-year-old Sidney Lumet in his only screen performance as an actor. It was the first Federal Theatre Project play to be sold to the film industry. The $5,000 fee was given to the Guild Committee for Federal Writers' Publications, a non-profit organization that included Heywood Broun, Franklin P. Adams, Lewis Mumford, and others. The play was published by Random House in 1938.

== Revival ==
One-Third of a Nation was revived in 2011 by the Metropolitan Playhouse in New York City. "Part history lesson, part protest, the play uses a series of sketches to dramatize ghastly housing conditions and to condemn corruption, speculators and slumlords," wrote The New York Times. "Much of the script remains fresh, with a wry, invisible narrator and characters who step out of scenes to comment on the action, which traverses more than 200 years." Backstage reported that "A nimble cast of 11 (the original had 25) delivers the show's still-relevant message — that everyone deserves a decent and affordable place to live — with force and conviction."
