= ...One Third of a Nation... =

- Theatrical release poster
- Directed by: Dudley Murphy
- Screenplay by: Oliver H.P. Garrett; Dudley Murphy
- Based on: One-Third of a Nation; 1937 play by Arthur Arent
- Produced by: Harold Orlob
- Starring: Sylvia Sidney; Leif Erickson; Myron McCormick; Hiram Sherman; Sidney Lumet; Muriel Hutchison
- Cinematography: William Miller
- Edited by: Duncan Mansfield
- Music by: Nathaniel Shilkret
- Production company: Dudley Murphy Productions
- Distributed by: Paramount Pictures
- Release date: February 10, 1939
- Running time: 79 minutes
- Country: United States
- Language: English
- Budget: under $200,000 or $165,000

...One Third of a Nation... is a 1939 American drama film directed by Dudley Murphy and written by Oliver H.P. Garrett and Dudley Murphy. The film stars Sylvia Sidney, Leif Erickson, Myron McCormick, Hiram Sherman, the future director Sidney Lumet and Muriel Hutchison. The film was released on February 10, 1939, by Paramount Pictures.

== Plot ==
When a fire breaks out in a run-down tenement in New York City, a young boy named Joey Rogers (Sidney Lumet) attempts to flee using a fire escape. It collapses due to ill repair, and Joey is severely injured. Joey's much older sister, Mary (Sylvia Sidney), rushes him to the hospital with the help of wealthy Peter Cortlant (Leif Erickson), who pays for Joey's medical bills on the spot. Cortlant is told by his business manager (Percy Waram) that he owns the building where the fire occurred.

The local district attorney investigates the fire, and tells Mary that the tenement's age means it was exempt from modern building safety codes. Since no tenants complained about the building before the fire, no crime has been committed. When Cortlant visits the tenement, he is warned to stay away from Mary by Mary's boyfriend, Sam (Myron McCormick).

Mary is upset when she learns that Cortlant owned her building. She removes Joey from the hospital. Crippled and suffering from delusions that the building is talking to him, Joey vows revenge on the tenement. Mary meets with Cortlant, and convinces him to turn his decrepit tenements into public housing and rebuild them. Appalled at the cost, Cortlant's sister, Ethel (Muriel Hutchison), tries to blackmail Cortlant into stopping the project by telling the press that he's having an affair with Mary.

Joey dies after setting fire to the tenement. Sam tells Cortlant that he will marry Mary to avoid scandal, which allows Cortlant to proceed with his plan.

== Cast ==
- Sylvia Sidney as Mary Rogers
- Leif Erickson as Peter Cortlant
- Myron McCormick as Sam Moon
- Hiram Sherman as Donald Hinchley
- Sidney Lumet as Joey Rogers
- Muriel Hutchison as Ethel Cortlant
- Percy Waram as Arthur Mather
- Otto Hulett as Assistant District Attorney
- Horace Sinclair as John
- Iris Adrian as Myrtle
- Charles Dingle as Mr. Rogers
- Edmonia Nolley as Mrs. Rogers
- Hugh Cameron as Mr. Cassidy
- Julia Fassett as Mrs. Cassidy
- Baruch Lumet as Mr. Rosen
- Byron Russell as Insp. Castle
- Robert George as Building Inspector
- Wayne Nunn as Insp. Waller
- Max Hirsch as Mr. Cohen
- Miriam Goldina as Mrs. Cohen
- Bea Hendricks as Min
- William Pote as Jim
- Stan Harper as harmonica player (uncredited)

== Production ==
It was the last feature film shot at Astoria Studios in New York until its reopening in the 1970s.
