= O. Louis Guglielmi =

American painter (1906–1956)

- Born: Osvaldo Louis Guglielmi; April 9, 1906; Cairo, Egypt
- Died: September 3, 1956 (aged 50); Amagansett, New York, U.S.
- Citizenship: Egypt; United States
- Known for: Painting

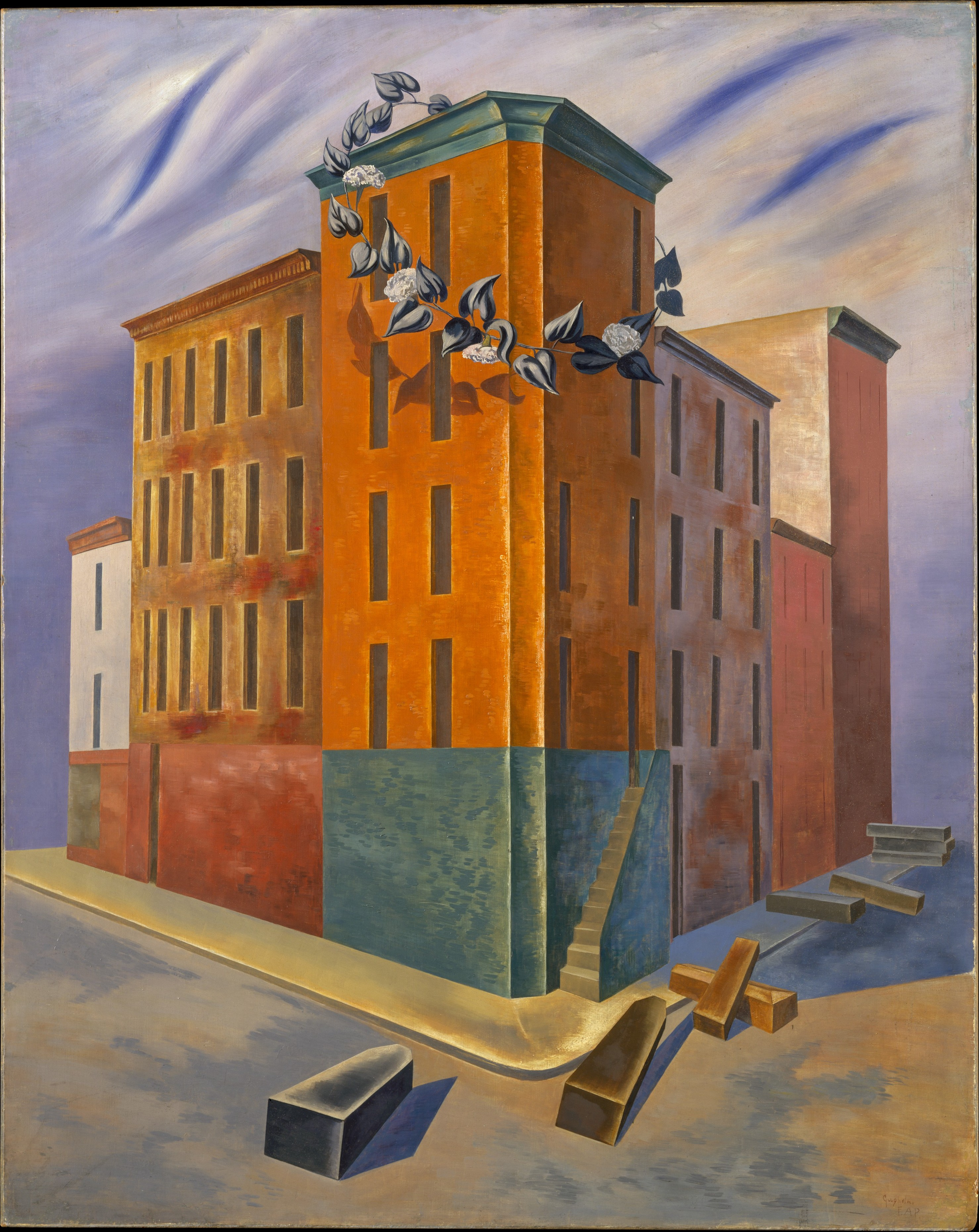
Guglielmi, "One Third of a Nation" (1939). 76.2 x 61 cm. The title is a reference to Franklin D. Roosevelt's inaugural address in 1937: "I see one-third of a nation ill-housed, ill-clad, ill-nourished. … The test of our progress is not whether we add more to the abundance of those who have much; it is whether we provide enough for those who have too little."

Osvaldo Louis Guglielmi (April 9, 1906 – September 3, 1956) was an American painter. He was well known in New York, but soon forgotten after his death, as abstract expressionism came to overshadow artists like him. There are elements of precisionism, surrealism, geometric abstraction, regionalism, and social realism in his work. His paintings often commented on poverty and other social and political themes; bleakness and death appear regularly in his pre-war works. With Walter Quirt and James Guy, he was a prominent exponent of "social surrealism". After the war, his painting became more planar and abstract, with elements of cubism, and he disavowed the personal sadness in his earlier works in favor of expressing the "exuberance and organic means of life itself". The New York Times also attributed his decline to his being "a relentless borrower, an irrepressible eclectic who seemed to prey voraciously on the styles of others".

Born in Cairo, Egypt, as a child he lived in Milan and Geneva while his Italian father, a professional violinist, toured the world. In 1914 his parents brought him to the United States, where they lived in Italian Harlem, New York. He was interested in sculpture at a young age and worked at a casting factory. He attended the National Academy of Design in the evening beginning in 1920, while also attending high school, and attended full-time from 1923 to 1926. The next year he became a naturalized citizen. The Great Depression brought financial hardship, but the difficult times inspired his artwork. From 1935 to 1939, he worked with the Federal Art Project, which supported artists during the Depression. In the 1930s he spent many summers at the MacDowell Colony for artists in Peterborough, New Hampshire.

Guglielmi had his first one-man show in 1938, exhibiting his new work Mental Geography. Inspired by the Spanish Civil War—depicting a bombed-out Brooklyn Bridge—it was a warning that European fascism might spread. Guglielmi was part of the 1943 "American Realists and Magic Realists" exhibition at the Museum of Modern Art. He was with the Army Corps of Engineers in the war between 1943 and 1945, and did not paint. In the 1950s, he held positions at Louisiana State University, first as a visiting artist and then as an associate professor. He died in 1956 of a heart attack in Amagansett, New York.

Guglielmi's work is in the collection of the Art Institute of Chicago, the Detroit Institute of Arts, the Metropolitan Museum of Art, the Museum of Modern Art, the San Francisco Museum of Modern Art, the Smithsonian American Art Museum, and the Whitney Museum of American Art.
