= Howard Bay (designer) =

- Born: 3 May 1912; Centralia, Washington
- Died: 21 November 1986 (aged 74); Manhattan, New York City, U.S.
- Occupation: Designer

Howard Bay (May 3, 1912 – November 21, 1986, New York City) was an American scenic, lighting and costume designer for stage, opera and film. He won the Tony Award for Best Scenic Design twice.

== Career ==
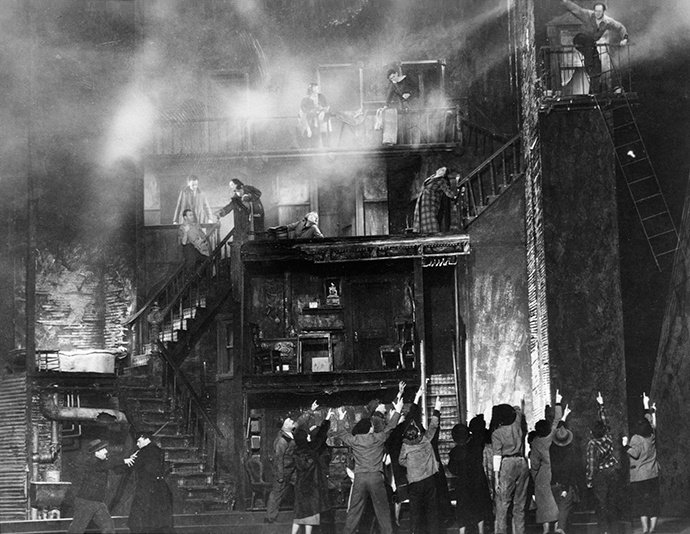
Howard Bay's set and the fatal fire in the tenement that begins One-Third of a Nation, a Living Newspaper about housing produced by the Federal Theatre Project (1938)

Howard Bay was born in Centralia, Washington to parents who were teachers; his father was an art teacher, his mother an English teacher. Over 50 years he designed the sets and lighting, as well as occasionally the costumes, for some 105 Broadway plays and musicals as well as operas and television shows.

Bay designed sets for the Federal Theatre Project in New York City, for four operas for the National Orchestral Association, performed at Carnegie Hall, 1939–1940 and for the operas Capriccio and Natalya Petrovna for the New York City Opera, 1965.

Bay first designed the sets for Broadway for the play Chalk Dust in 1936. In the field of musicals, he designed, among others, sets and lighting for Show Boat (1946), The Music Man (1957) and Finian's Rainbow (1955 [sets], 1960). He designed the original sets, lighting and costumes for Man of La Mancha in 1965 and all revivals. For dramas, for example, he designed the sets and lighting for The Little Foxes (1967), My Mother, My Father and Me (1963), Toys in the Attic (1960), and The Big Knife (1949).

For television he was the Art director for the Fred Waring Show, CBS, 1953–1955; Somerset Maugham Theatre, CBS and NBC, 1954–1956, and Mr. Broadway, CBS, 1964.

He worked on the films The Exile (1947) and Up in Central Park (1948), as the production designer.

He taught theater arts at Brandeis University for 14 years. Bay was president of United Scenic Artists for many years.

== Personal ==
He married Ruth Jonas on November 23, 1932, and they had two children, Ellen and Timothy. He died of a myocardial infarction in 1986.

== Awards and nominations ==
- Tony Award Best Scenic Design - Cry for Us All (nominee) (1970)
- Tony Award Best Costume Design - Man of La Mancha (nominee) (1966)
- Tony Award Best Scenic Design - Man of La Mancha (winner) (1966)
- Tony Award Best Scenic Design (Play) - Toys in the Attic (winner) (1960)
