= Walter Kerr Theatre =

Broadway theater in Manhattan, New York

- Ritz Theatre
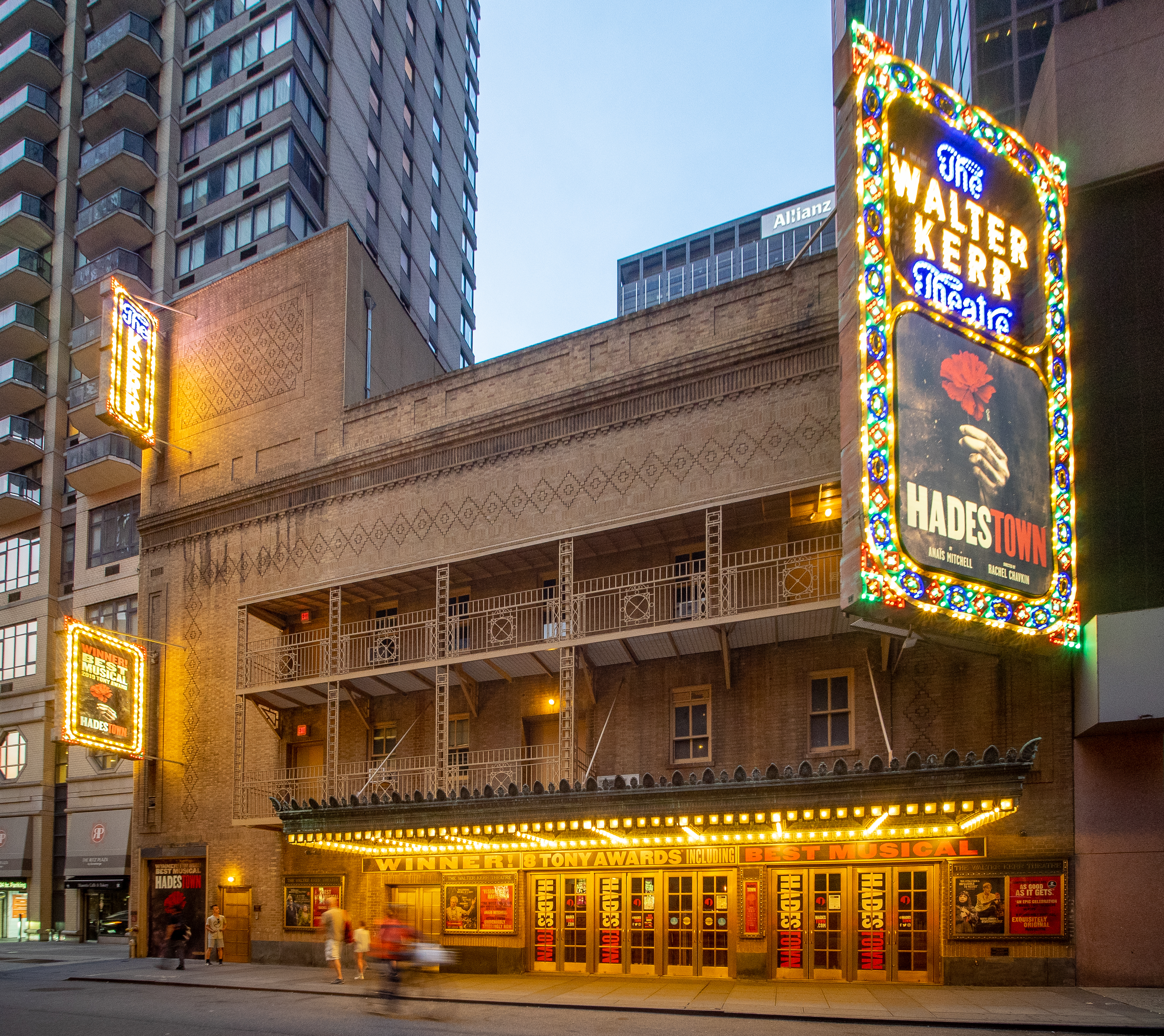
- Walter Kerr Theatre in 2019
- Interactive map of Walter Kerr Theatre
- Address: 219 West 48th Street; Manhattan, New York; United States
- Coordinates: 40°45′38″N 73°59′08″W
- Owner: ATG Entertainment
- Capacity: 975
- Type: Broadway
- Production: Hadestown

Construction
- Opened: March 21, 1921 (105 years ago)
- Years active: 1921–1939, 1942–1943, 1971–1973, 1983–present
- Architect: Herbert J. Krapp

Website
- us.atgtickets.com/venues/walter-kerr-theatre/

The Walter Kerr Theatre, previously the Ritz Theatre, is a Broadway theater at 219 West 48th Street in the Theater District of Midtown Manhattan in New York City, New York, U.S. The theater was designed by Herbert J. Krapp and was constructed for the Shubert brothers in 1921. The venue, renamed in 1990 after theatrical critic Walter Kerr, has 975 seats across three levels and is operated by ATG Entertainment. The facade is plainly designed and is made of patterned brick. The auditorium contains Adam-style detailing, two balconies, and murals.

The Shuberts developed the Ritz Theatre after World War I as part of a theatrical complex around 48th and 49th Streets. The Ritz Theatre opened on March 21, 1921, with the play Mary Stuart, and it was leased to William Harris Jr., who operated it for a decade. After many unsuccessful shows, the theater was leased to the Works Progress Administration's Federal Theatre Project from 1936 to 1939, then served as a CBS and NBC broadcasting studio. The Ritz briefly hosted legitimate shows in 1942 and 1943, and it again functioned as a studio for ABC until 1965. The Ritz was abandoned for several years until Eddie Bracken took over in 1970, renovating it and hosting several short-lived shows from 1971 to 1973. During the 1970s, the Ritz variously operated as a pornographic theater, vaudeville house, children's theater, and poster-storage warehouse. Jujamcyn Theaters took over in 1981 and reopened it two years later following an extensive restoration. The theater was renovated again in 1990 and renamed after Kerr. Jujamcyn merged in 2023 with ATG, which continued to operate the theater.

== Site ==
The Walter Kerr Theatre is on 219 West 48th Street, on the south sidewalk between Eighth Avenue and Broadway, in the Midtown Manhattan neighborhood of New York City, New York, U.S. The rectangular land lot covers 8,034 square feet (746.4 m^{2}), with a frontage of 80 feet (24 m) on 49th Street and a depth of 100 ft (30 m). The Walter Kerr shares the block with the Eugene O'Neill Theatre to the north and Crowne Plaza Times Square Manhattan to the east. Other nearby buildings include One Worldwide Plaza and St. Malachy Roman Catholic Church to the northwest, the Ambassador Theatre and the Brill Building to the northeast, the Morgan Stanley Building to the southeast, the Longacre Theatre and Ethel Barrymore Theatre to the south, and the Samuel J. Friedman Theatre to the southwest.

== Design ==
The Walter Kerr Theatre was designed by Herbert J. Krapp and was constructed in 1921 for the Shubert brothers. It is part of a group of six theaters planned by the Shuberts after World War I, of which four were built. Edward Margolies was the general contractor who built the theater.

=== Facade ===
The facade is simple in design, especially when compared with Krapp's other works for the Shubert family. The Ambassador and Ritz theaters, in particular, were designed in patterned brick, with the only ornamentation being in the arrangement of the brick. This sparse ornamentation may be attributed to the lack of money in the years after World War I. Theatrical historian William Morrison described the design scheme as "utilitarian in the extreme", decorated only by fire escapes in front of the facade, as well as brickwork laid in a diamond pattern. A marquee hangs above the entrance at ground level, and a large sign is mounted on the right side of the facade, facing east.

=== Auditorium ===
The auditorium is accessed by a lobby decorated with fake-granite walls and a burgundy ceiling. The Walter Kerr Theatre has an orchestra level and two balconies. The interior layout was similar to Krapp's earlier Broadhurst and Plymouth (now Gerald Schoenfeld) theaters, but the Ritz had fewer seats than either the Broadhurst or the Plymouth, with only about 975 total at the time of opening. The Broadway League cites the theater as having 945 seats, while Playbill gives a figure of 918 seats. Only the orchestra level is wheelchair-accessible; the other seating levels can only be reached by steps. The main restrooms are placed on the first balcony level, but there are wheelchair-accessible restrooms on the orchestra level.

Like Krapp's other Broadway houses, the auditorium's interior is decorated in the Adam style. The interior color scheme was originally purple, vermillion, and gold. The Shubert family's design studio oversaw the decorative scheme. A contemporary newspaper article said the interior used a gold leaf design that was "suggestive of the Italian Renaissance". In 1983, the theater was redecorated in pink, mauve, and gray.

The proscenium arch at the front of the auditorium was 24 ft (7.3 m) tall and 40 ft (12 m) wide. Above the proscenium arch is a mural that was restored in a 1983 renovation. This mural depicts Diana with two hounds; it is unknown who originally designed the mural. Two other murals had been planned for the Ritz when it opened, but they were not installed until the 1980s. The theater also contains Art Deco chandeliers, lights, and sconces, which date from 1983.

== History ==
Times Square became the epicenter for large-scale theater productions between 1900 and the Great Depression. During the 1900s and 1910s, many theaters in Midtown Manhattan were developed by the Shubert brothers, one of the major theatrical syndicates of the time. The Shuberts originated from Syracuse, New York, and expanded downstate into New York City in the first decade of the 20th century. The brothers controlled a quarter of all plays and three-quarters of theatrical ticket sales in the U.S. by 1925. After World War I, the Shuberts contemplated the construction of six theaters along 48th and 49th Streets, just north of Times Square. Of these, only four were built, and only three (the Ambassador, O'Neill, and Kerr) survive. (Note: The other was the 49th Street Theatre at 235 West 49th Street, which opened in 1921 and was demolished in 1940.)

=== Original Broadway run ===
==== 1920s ====
The Shuberts announced plans for their six new theaters in September 1920. The brothers believed that the sites on 48th and 49th Streets could be as profitable as theaters on 42nd Street, which historically was Times Square's legitimate theatrical hub. A site on 48th Street was selected in addition to three on 49th Street, and Krapp was hired to design the theaters. That February, the Shuberts announced that the theater on 48th Street would be called the Ritz and that it would open the next month. Only 66 days had elapsed from the start of construction to the theater's completion, which the New-York Tribune called a "world's record".

The theater opened on March 21, 1921, with John Drinkwater's Mary Stuart. The next month, William Harris Jr. leased the Ritz Theatre for ten years, and he immediately brought the Porter Emerson Browne play The Bad Man to the Ritz. Later that year, the theater hosted its first hit: the play Bluebeard's Eighth Wife, featuring Ina Claire. The Ritz mostly hosted short runs of plays in its early years, such as Madame Pierre in 1922 with Roland Young. The next year, the theater hosted The Enchanted Cottage with Katharine Cornell, as well as In Love with Love with Lynn Fontanne. The play Outward Bound, with Margalo Gillmore, Leslie Howard, and Alfred Lunt, opened at the Ritz in January 1924. That July, Hassard Short leased the theater for his Ritz Revue, which opened in September and was the theater's first musical production. Also that year, Al Jolson's Coolidge-Dawes Theatrical League was established at the theater, and the venue staged the John Galsworthy play Old English with George Arliss.

The play The Kiss in the Taxi opened at the Ritz in 1925 with Claudette Colbert, and Young Blood with Helen Hayes opened later that year. This was followed in 1927 by Bye, Bye, Bonnie with Ruby Keeler, The Legend of Leonora with Grace George, and The Thief with Alice Brady and Lionel Atwill. A. H. Woods leased the Ritz later that year to show his play The First of These Gentlemen. The play Excess Baggage opened at the end of 1927, featuring Frank McHugh and Miriam Hopkins, and lasted through mid-1928. The next production was also a success: Courage with Janet Beecher, which opened in October 1928 and ran until the following June. Subsequently, the theater hosted Broken Dishes, which opened in November 1929 and featured Donald Meek and Bette Davis. The same month, the popular comedy Mendel, Inc. opened with Smith and Dale, running through the next year. By the end of the 1920s, the Shuberts had taken over the Ritz Theatre's bookings from Harris after several flop runs.

==== 1930s ====
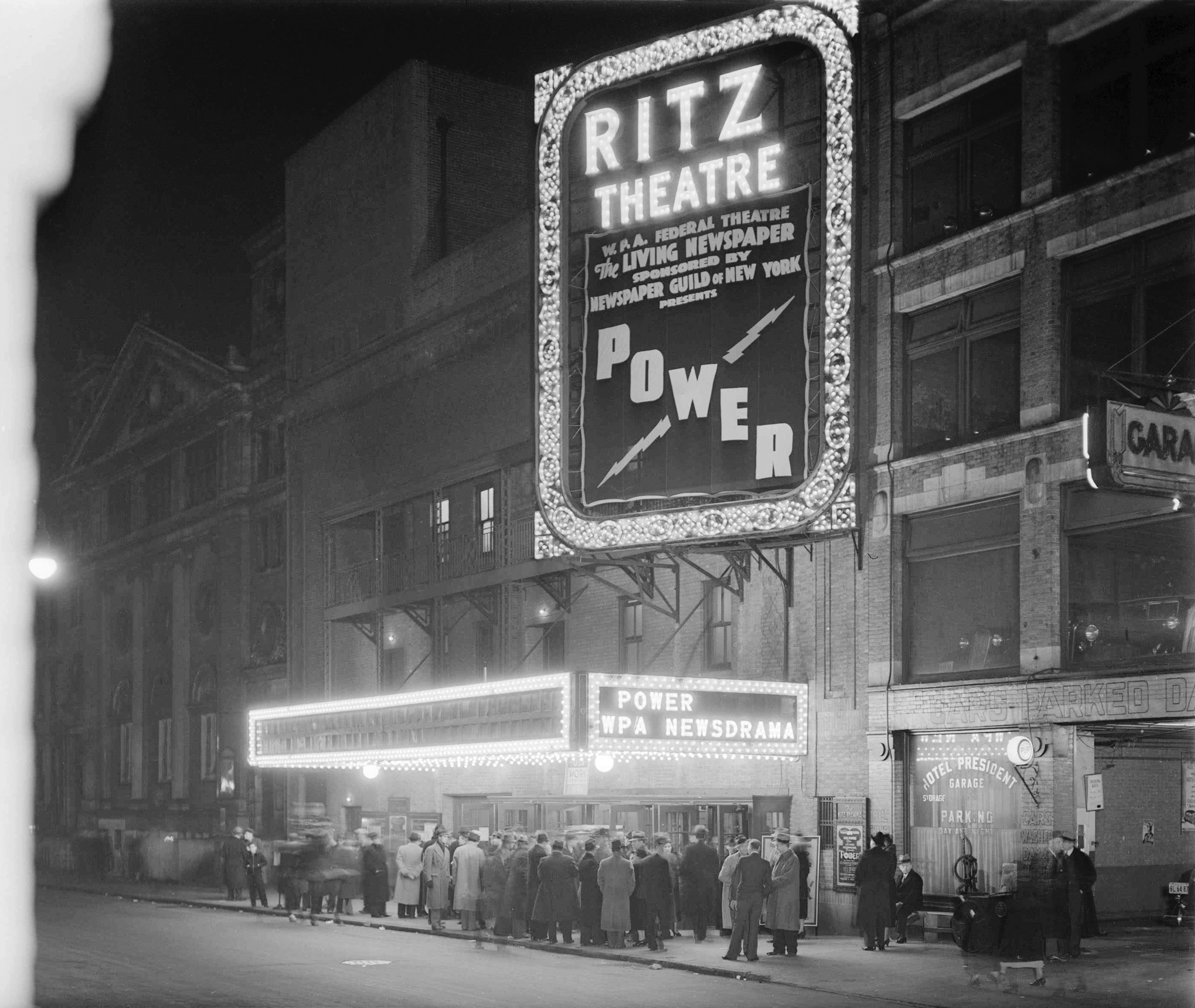
The Federal Theatre Project's Living Newspaper production, Power (February–August 1937)

Many of the Ritz Theatre's productions in the 1930s were short-lived. Among these shows was a version of the English play Nine till Six with an all-female cast in late 1930. The next year saw a two-week run of the Pulitzer Prize-winning play Alison's House, as well as Elliott Lester's Two Seconds. Additionally, Ruth Draper performed a series of character sketches at the Ritz in late 1932. The Elizabeth McFadden melodrama Double Door occupied the Ritz during late 1933, while Mildred Natwick and Frank Lawton starred the next year in The Wind and the Rain. Other shows of the period included Petticoat Fever in 1935 with Leo G. Carroll and Dennis King, as well as Co-Respondent Unknown in 1936 with Peggy Conklin and Ilka Chase.

In December 1936, the Works Progress Administration (WPA)'s Federal Theatre Project hosted a week-long run of its dance program, The Eternal Prodigal, at the Ritz after eleven months of preparation. The theater hosted Power, a show produced as part of the WPA's Living Newspaper series, the following February; it lasted for five months. In November 1937, the Surry Players presented their revival of Shakespeare's As You Like It at the Ritz. Next, Gilbert Miller's production of the T. S. Eliot play Murder in the Cathedral opened at the Ritz in February 1938, running for six weeks. The WPA then premiered the musical Pinocchio at the Ritz in January 1939, but the production closed that May after the Federal Theatre Project was dissolved.

=== Playhouse ===
==== Broadcasting studio ====
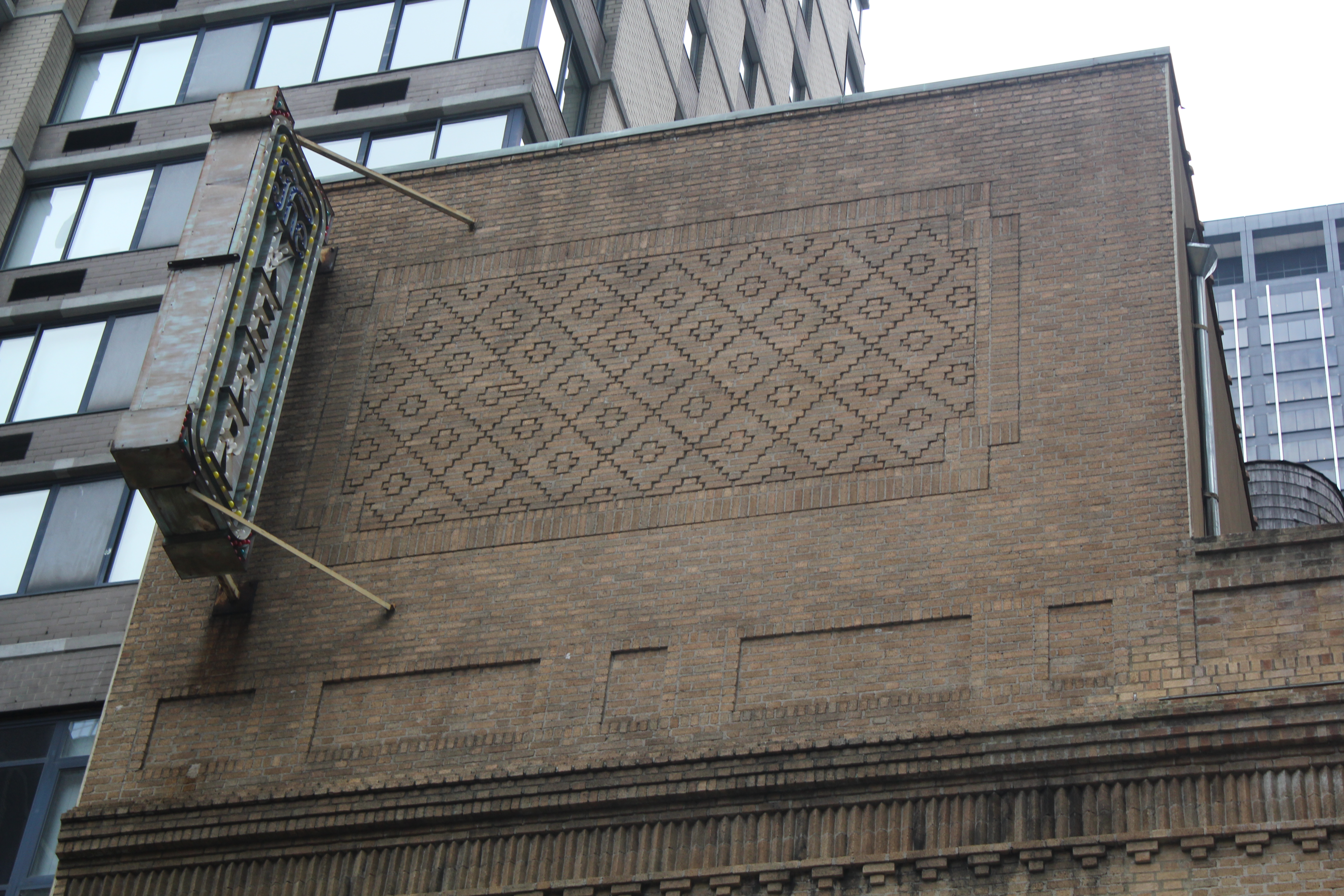
View of the plain brick facade

Lee Shubert leased the Ritz to CBS in October 1939. Consequently, the Ritz became known as CBS Theater No. 4, supplementing three other broadcast studios at 141 West 45th Street, 251 West 45th Street, and 1697 Broadway. CBS quickly put Theater No. 4 into use for the taping of The Gay Nineties Revue and Walter O'Keefe's Tuesday Night Party. The Ritz had served as a CBS theater for only a few months when NBC signed a 25-week lease for the theater in January 1940. Among other things, the NBC studio was used for taping the TV program 21 Men and a Girl, as well as a speech by 1940 U.S. presidential candidate Wendell Willkie. NBC's lease on the Ritz expired at the beginning of 1942, and the theater returned to legitimate use with the opening of the revue Harlem Cavalcade in May 1942. Leonard Sillman's New Faces of 1943 opened that December. This was followed in 1943 by a revival of the long-running play Tobacco Road.

The Blue Network leased the Ritz Theatre in late 1943, initially using the theater for public-relations broadcasts. The Blue Network studio was used to broadcast Radio Hall of Fame, the first regular-network show to be recorded by television cameras, as well as such events as a concert recital by Thomas Beecham. The Hattie Hill estate sold the theater to the Simon brothers in March 1945; at the time, it was a broadcast studio for WJZ-TV (later WABC-TV). That November, the Shubert brothers acquired the theater from Leonard H. Burns, Margaret F. Doyle, and Harriet P. Stieff. ABC, which operated WJZ-TV, was leasing the theater for three-year periods as of 1946. It was one of three studios ABC was using by the late 1940s. ABC's broadcasts at the theater included a game show called Stop the Music (for which a second-floor dressing room was equipped with a telephone switchboard), as well as a Thanksgiving variety show.

ABC upgraded the lighting and expanded the Ritz's stage by about 600 ft^{2} (56 m^{2}) in 1950; this required the removal of all seating in the orchestra. At the time, the Ritz was one of several former Broadway theaters that had been converted to broadcast studios within the last several years. The ABC studio remained in use even as the Shuberts sold the theater to John Minary in July 1956. In turn, Minary sold the theater to real-estate investor Joseph P. Blitz that December; at the time, the venue was reported as having 600 seats. Blitz co-owned the theater with Herbert Fischbach, who in February 1957 bought out Blitz's stake. The Royal Ballet obtained an option on the Ritz in 1962, intending to show four ballets by Alan Carter. Leonard Tow and Roger Euster, owners of the Little Theatre (another Broadway house converted to a studio), acquired the Ritz in 1963. The next year, Euster sold his stake to Leonard B. Moore. Subsequently, the theater was dark from 1965 to 1969.

==== Brief legitimate return, children's theater ====
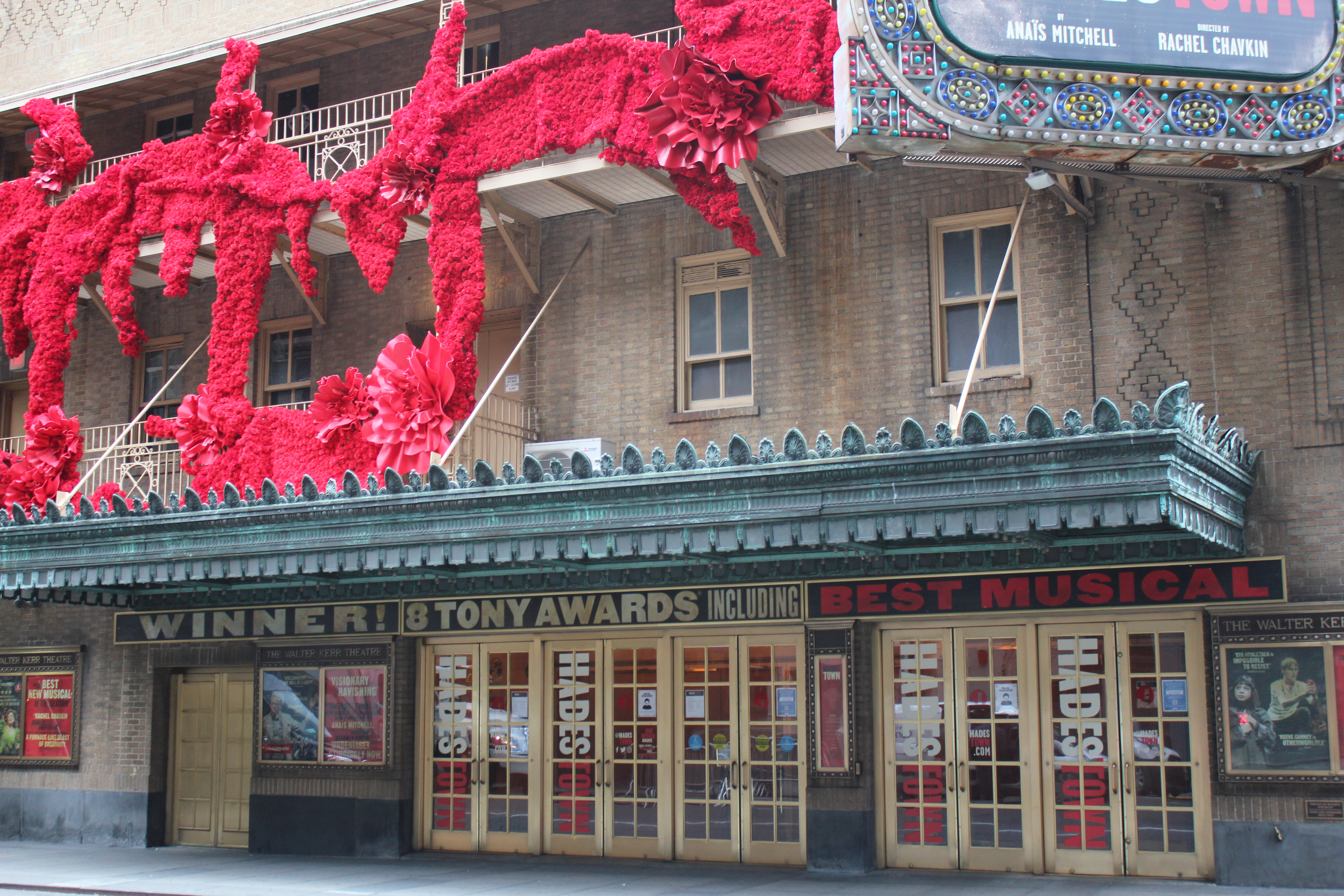
Marquee

In 1970, Eddie Bracken took over the theater. The rock opera Soon was booked for the Ritz, marking the first legitimate production at the theater in nearly three decades, but Soon closed after three performances in January 1971. This was followed in April 1971 by August Strindberg's Dance of Death, with Rip Torn and Viveca Lindfors, which closed after five performances. Both of these plays used temporary seats that were installed above the concrete orchestra. Subsequently, the theater hosted pornographic films and vaudeville, with a massage parlor backstage.

The producer Arthur Whitelaw and his partners Seth Whitelaw, Ben Gerard, and Joseph Hardy, took a 15-year lease on the Ritz, originally intending to house their Movie Musical Theatre there. They restored the theater in 1972 for $225,000, installing new carpets, chairs, and lighting. The restored theater had 896 seats, though the first two rows of seats could be removed. The Ritz reopened on March 8, 1972, with the musical Children! Children!, featuring Gwen Verdon. The show was so poorly received that it closed the same night. The next show was the play Hurry, Harry in October 1972; like its predecessors, the show was a flop, closing after two performances. This was followed in February 1973 by the British hit No Sex Please, We're British with Maureen O'Sullivan, but it failed on Broadway with 16 performances.

After the Ritz had been vacant for several months, the Robert F. Kennedy Theater for Children took over in September 1973, opening the next month. During this time, the children's theater was fighting lawsuits over whether it could be named after the late politician Robert F. Kennedy. The RFK Children's Theater neglected to pay rent and, in 1976, it was evicted from the Ritz under an action brought by the Fidelity Mutual Life Insurance Company of Philadelphia. Afterward, the Ritz was used to store posters. The city government took over the theater, and the venue's roof began to leak.

=== Jujamcyn and ATG operation ===
==== 1980s ====
In 1981, developer Jason Carter and Jujamcyn Theaters submitted bids for the Ritz at a foreclosure auction. Carter won the auction, but he sold the theater to Jujamcyn for $1.7 million, keeping its air rights for the construction of a skyscraper called Ritz Plaza. The Ritz had to continue presenting legitimate shows in exchange for the air rights, but Carter had intended to build apartments above the theater. In August 1981, Jujamcyn announced that it had acquired the Ritz and ANTA (now August Wilson) theaters. Jujamcyn announced it would reopen the Ritz to counterbalance the impending demolition of the Helen Hayes and Morosco theaters two blocks south. Roger Morgan Studios and Karen Rosen of KMR Design (Note: Although Botto & Mitchell 2002, p. 134, describes Rosen as having been part of a 1990 renovation, contemporary sources cite her as having renovated the theater in 1983.) oversaw the theater's renovation, which cost $1.5 million. New lighting fixtures and seats were installed, along with new stage lighting, plumbing, and air-conditioning. A new 85 ft-wide (26 m) stage was built, while the 43 ft-wide (13 m) proscenium opening was retained. The second balcony level, used for air-conditioning equipment, was turned into a seating level.

The renovation was actually completed in 1982, but Jujamcyn had not been able to book any shows for the 1982–1983 theatrical season. The show Hell of a Town had actually been booked in 1982 but was later dropped. Finally, on May 10, 1983, The Flying Karamazov Brothers reopened the theater with their eponymous juggling show. The next January, Ian McKellen appeared in a solo show, Acting Shakespeare; it ran for a month. Afterward, the Ritz tried limiting the audiences for several shows to 499 seats, because a 500-seat house would require negotiations with Broadway theatrical unions. Broadway theatrical unions had classified the Ritz as "endangered" because it was consistently underused. Producer Morton Gottlieb first proposed the 499-seat plan for his play Dancing in the End Zone in 1984. This was followed by Doubles in 1985, which subsequently became a success and switched to using the theater's full capacity, as well as the revue Jerome Kern Goes to Hollywood in 1986.

The New York City Landmarks Preservation Commission (LPC) had started considering protecting the Ritz as a landmark in 1982, with discussions continuing over the next several years. While the LPC commenced a wide-ranging effort to grant landmark status to Broadway theaters in 1987, the Ritz was among the few theaters for which the LPC denied either exterior or interior landmark status. (Note: Only the Ritz, Nederlander, and Broadway theaters were denied both interior and exterior landmark status. Several other theaters had either their exterior or interior landmark status rejected, but not both. Hearings for several theaters on 42nd Street were deferred to 2016, when they were rejected.) Among the theater's productions in 1987 were the play A Month of Sundays, the musical Nite Comic, and a Penn & Teller special. In 1989, Rocco Landesman announced that the theater would be refurbished for $1.9 million and that it would be renamed for drama critic Walter Kerr. The last production staged at the Ritz prior to its renaming was Chu Chem, which ran from April to May 1989. By the end of the year, the facade had been cleaned at a cost of $400,000.

==== 1990s and 2000s ====
The theater reopened on March 5, 1990, with a musical tribute to Walter Kerr. The first production at the newly renovated theater was August Wilson's The Piano Lesson, which opened the next month, running through January 1991. The Shuberts, the Nederlanders, and Jujamcyn formed the Broadway Alliance in June 1990, wherein each company set aside one of its theaters to present dramas and comedies at reduced ticket prices. The program covered the Belasco, Nederlander, and Walter Kerr theaters. The Paul Rudnick play I Hate Hamlet then opened in April 1991 and ran for 80 performances. This was followed in 1992 by Abraham Tetenbaum's short-lived play Crazy He Calls Me and Wilson's Two Trains Running. Tony Kushner's Angels in America: Millennium Approaches, the first part of a two-part play, opened in May 1993. The second part, Angels in America: Perestroika, opened in November 1993; the two parts were performed in repertory until the end of 1994. Terrence McNally's play Love! Valour! Compassion! transferred from off-Broadway in 1995, and Patti LuPone performed a solo concert later that year for 46 performances. Wilson's Seven Guitars premiered at the Walter Kerr in 1996, followed by a revival of Noël Coward's play Present Laughter.

The dance special Forever Tango launched at the Walter Kerr in 1997, running for nine months. The next two productions were hits by Irish playwrights. Martin McDonagh's off-Broadway play The Beauty Queen of Leenane moved to the Walter Kerr in 1998, followed the next year by Conor McPherson's The Weir. Coward's Waiting in the Wings had its first Broadway production at the Walter Kerr in December 1999, relocating three months later to the Eugene O'Neill Theatre. The Eugene O'Neill play A Moon for the Misbegotten was then revived in March 2000, running for several months. David Auburn's play Proof transferred from off-Broadway that October, running for 917 performances through January 2003. Next, the comedy Take Me Out opened in February 2003 and ran for a year, This was followed in April 2004 by the short-lived drama Sixteen Wounded, then in December 2004 by Wilson's Gem of the Ocean.

After Jujamcyn president James Binger died in 2004, Rocco Landesman bought the Walter Kerr and Jujamcyn's four other theaters in 2005, along with the air rights above them. Jordan Roth joined Jujamcyn as a resident producer the same year. John Patrick Shanley's play Doubt: A Parable also opened at the Walter Kerr in 2005, running for over a year. Subsequently, the musical Grey Gardens opened in late 2006 for a 307-performance run, and Chazz Palminteri's solo show A Bronx Tale launched at the theater in 2007. The Walter Kerr showed several relatively short runs in 2008 and 2009, including A Catered Affair, The Seagull, and Irena's Vow. In 2009, Roth acquired a 50 percent stake in Jujamcyn and assumed full operation of the firm when Landesman joined the National Endowments of the Arts. At the end of that year, the Stephen Sondheim musical A Little Night Music was revived, running until January 2011.

==== 2010s to present ====
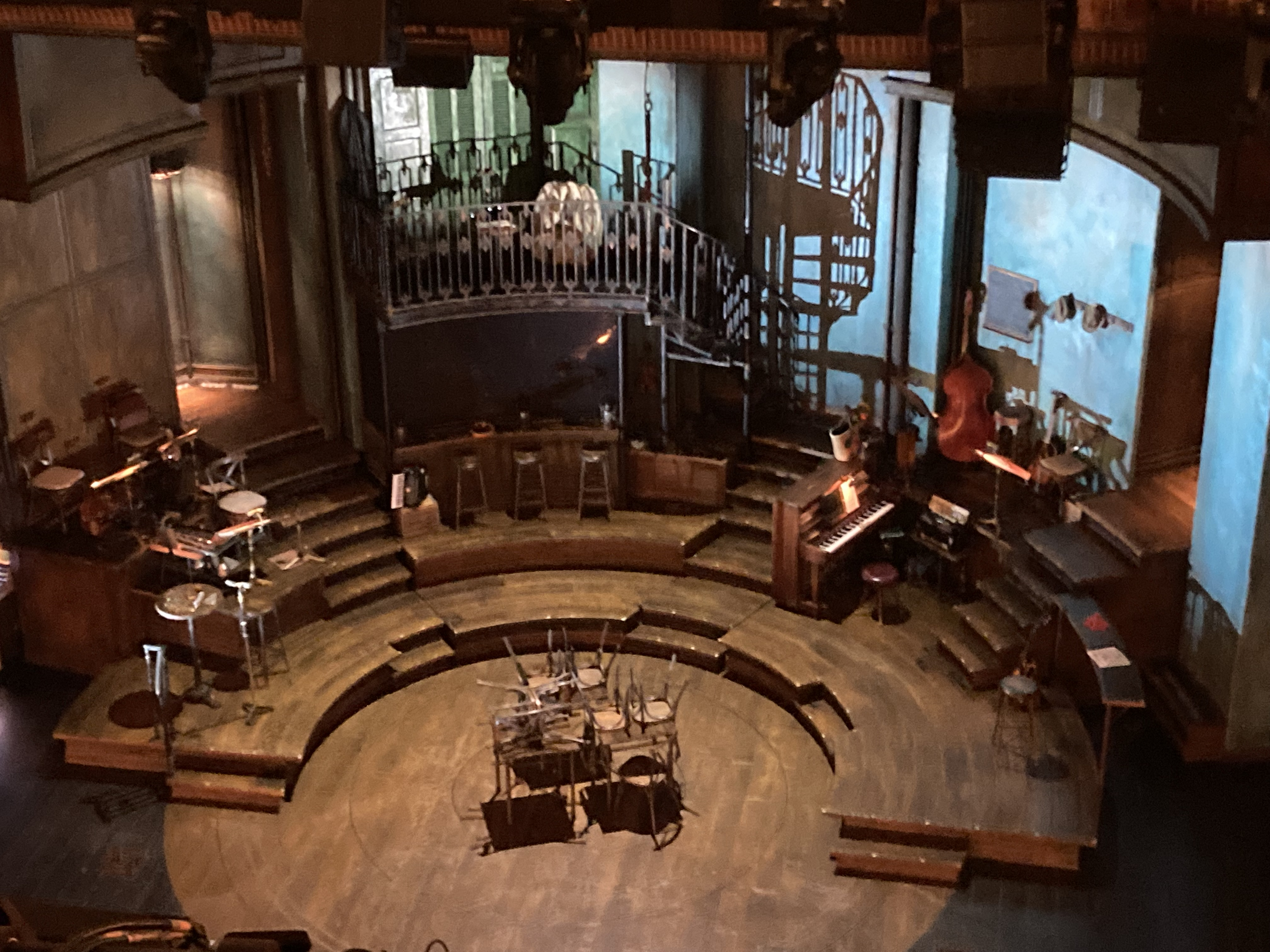
Stage of the Walter Kerr Theatre with the set of Hadestown

The first new productions of the 2010s were a revival of John Guare's The House of Blue Leaves in 2011, followed the same year by the musical Lysistrata Jones. The Walter Kerr then hosted the plays Clybourne Park, The Heiress, and The Testament of Mary over the next two years, as well as a revival of the Forever Tango dance special in mid-2013. The musical comedy A Gentleman's Guide to Love and Murder opened in November 2013, and it stayed for almost 1,000 performances through the beginning of 2016, having nearly failed early on. The next two shows were revivals: Arthur Miller's drama The Crucible, which opened in March 2016, and William Finn and James Lapine's musical Falsettos, which opened that October.

The Walter Kerr then hosted an original production of the musical Amélie in April and May 2017. That October, musician Bruce Springsteen commenced his concert special Springsteen on Broadway, which was originally supposed to stay at the theater for eight weeks. The show instantly became popular and was extended three times, (Note: Springsteen on Broadway was originally supposed to end in November 2017. It was extended first to February 2018, then to June and finally to December.) the last performance being December 15, 2018. The musical Hadestown was the next show to open at the Walter Kerr, premiering in April 2019; as of 2023, it is the longest-running show in the theater's history. All Broadway theaters temporarily closed on March 12, 2020, due to the COVID-19 pandemic. The Walter Kerr reopened on September 2, 2021, with performances of Hadestown. Jujamcyn and Ambassador Theatre Group (ATG) agreed to merge in early 2023; the combined company would operate seven Broadway theaters, including the Walter Kerr. In July 2023, Jordan Roth sold a 93 percent stake in Jujamcyn's five theaters, including the Walter Kerr Theatre, to ATG and Providence Equity.

== Notable productions ==
Productions are listed by the year of their first performance. This list only includes Broadway shows; it does not include other live shows or films presented at the theater, nor does it include shows that were taped there.

=== Ritz Theatre ===
Notable productions at the theater
Opening year	Name	Refs.
1921	The Bad Man	
1921	Bluebeard's Eighth Wife	
1922	It Is the Law	
1923	The Humming Bird	
1923	The Sporting Thing To Do	
1923	The Enchanted Cottage	
1924	Outward Bound	
1925	A Kiss in a Taxi	
1927	The Legend of Leonora	
1929	Soldiers and Women	
1931	Alison's House	
1931	Two Seconds	
1933	Before Morning	
1935	Abide with Me	
1937	As You Like It	
1937	Power	
1938	Time and the Conways	
1938	Murder in the Cathedral	
1942	My Sister Eileen	
1943	Tobacco Road	
1971	Soon	
1971	Dance of Death	
1972	Children! Children!	
1973	No Sex Please, We're British	
1983	The Flying Karamazov Brothers	
1984	Acting Shakespeare	
1988	Penn & Teller	
1989	Chu Chem	

=== Walter Kerr Theatre ===
Since its reopening, the Walter Kerr has housed seven winners of the Tony Award for Best Play: Angels in America: Millennium Approaches, Angels in America: Perestroika, Love! Valour! Compassion!, Proof, Take Me Out, Doubt, and Clybourne Park. It also housed two winners of the Tony Award for Best Musical: A Gentleman's Guide to Love and Murder and Hadestown.

Notable productions at the theater
Opening year	Name	Refs.
1990	The Piano Lesson	
1991	I Hate Hamlet	
1992	Two Trains Running	
1993	Angels in America (Note: Composed of two productions: Angels in America: Millennium Approaches and Angels in America: Perestroika)	
1995	Love! Valour! Compassion!	
1996	Patti LuPone on Broadway	
1996	Seven Guitars	
1996	Present Laughter	
1998	The Beauty Queen of Leenane	
1999	The Weir	
1999	Waiting in the Wings	
2000	A Moon for the Misbegotten	
2000	Proof	
2003	Take Me Out	
2004	Gem of the Ocean	
2005	Doubt: A Parable	
2006	Grey Gardens	
2007	A Bronx Tale	
2008	A Catered Affair	
2008	The Seagull	
2009	Irena's Vow	
2009	A Little Night Music	
2011	The House of Blue Leaves	
2011	Lysistrata Jones	
2012	Clybourne Park	
2012	The Heiress	
2013	The Testament of Mary	
2013	A Gentleman's Guide to Love and Murder	
2016	The Crucible	
2016	Falsettos	
2017	Amélie	
2017	Springsteen on Broadway	
2019	Hadestown	
