= 1935 (play) =

1935 was a theatre piece consisting of 18 dramatic sketches by multiple writers. The piece was created under the supervision of Arthur Arent and used music by Lee Wainer. It had no singular point of view but strung together the events of the year 1935 using a Greek like chorus. It was produced by the Federal Theatre Project (FTP) and was part of the FTP's Living Newspaper series which presented dramatizations of real events from newspaper reporting. It opened on Broadway at the Biltmore Theatre on May 12, 1936. It ran for a total of 34 performances; closing on June 1, 1936.
