= Hiram Sherman =

American actor

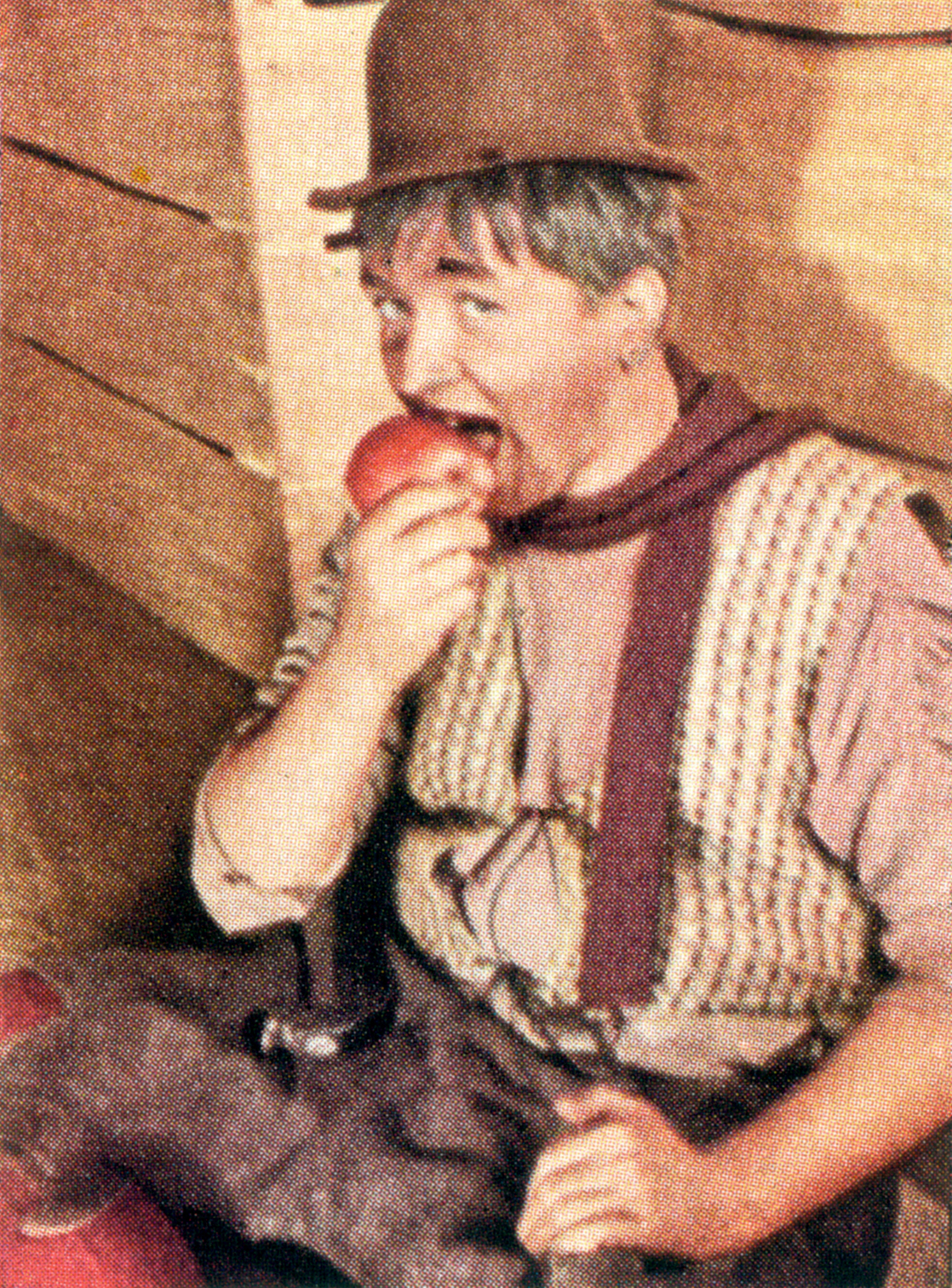
- As Firk in The Shoemaker's Holiday (1938)
- Born: February 11, 1908; Boston, Massachusetts, U.S.
- Died: April 11, 1989 (aged 81); Springfield, Illinois, U.S.
- Occupation: Actor
- Years active: 1934–1989

Hiram Sherman (February 11, 1908 – April 11, 1989) was an American actor.

== Biography ==
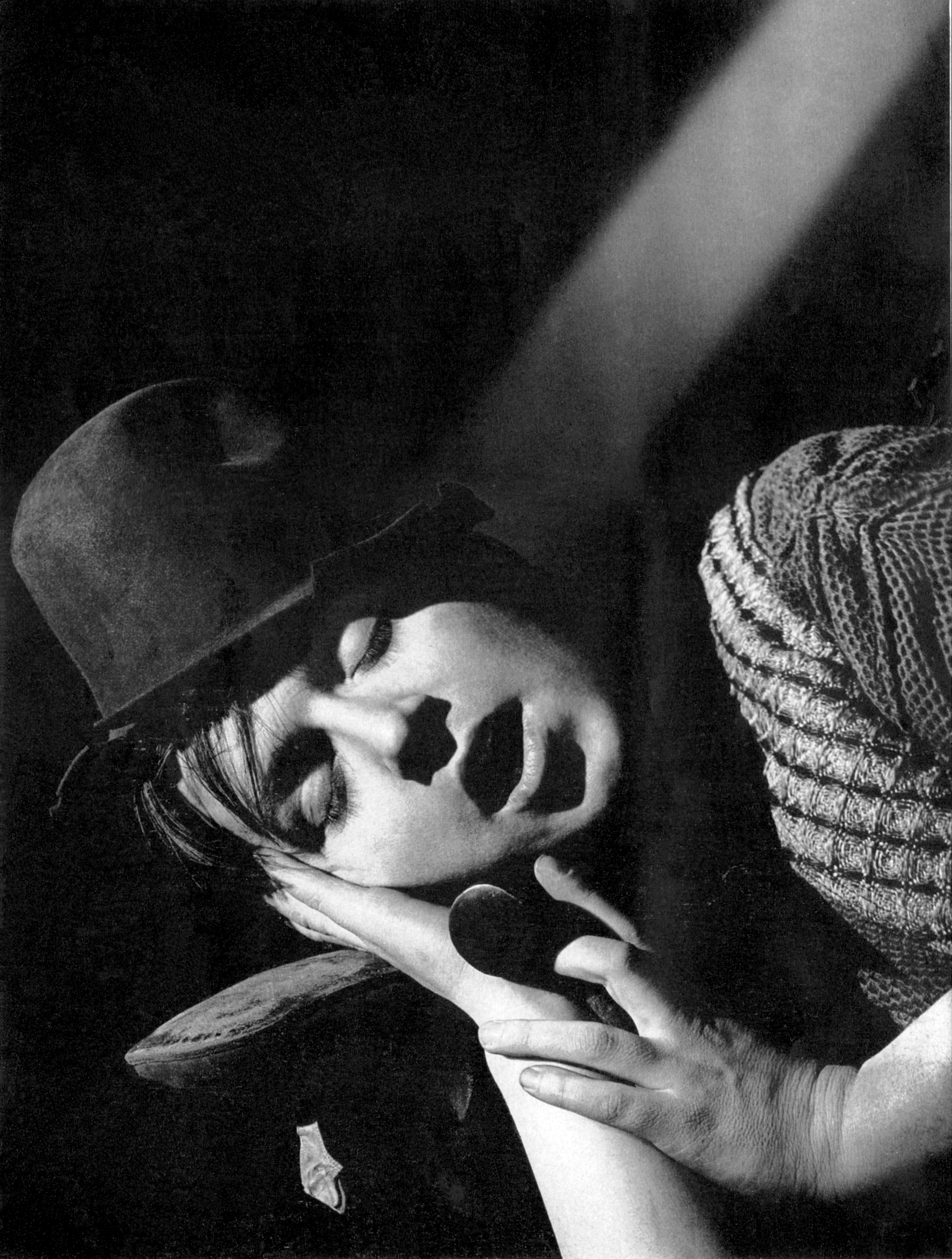
Character portrait of Sherman in The Shoemaker's Holiday (1938)

Hiram Sherman was born in Boston, Massachusetts. His father, Clifford Leon Sherman, worked in the art department of The Boston Globe.

He made his Broadway debut as a playwright with the short-lived comedy Too Much Party in 1934. The farce, directed by William Friedlander, opened at the Theatre Masque on March 5, 1934, and closed after only eight performances. It proved to be his sole attempt at writing. Two years later he made his Broadway debut as an actor in the Federal Theatre Project's Horse Eats Hat. In 1937 he played Junior Mister in the original production of The Cradle Will Rock.

Additional theatre credits include the inaugural Mercury Theatre productions Caesar and The Shoemaker's Holiday, Very Warm for May, Cyrano de Bergerac, Boyd's Daughter (which he also directed), Mary, Mary, and 3 for Tonight. He won the Tony Award for Best Featured Actor in a Musical for Two's Company and How Now, Dow Jones. Sherman debuted on stage in London in 1949 in Brigadoon. He appeared in London's West End as Matthew Cuthbert in the British premiere of Anne of Green Gables.

On television, Sherman portrayed Simon Ward on The Tammy Grimes Show. His other television credits included such early anthology series as Kraft Television Theatre, Studio One, The Alcoa Hour, and Hallmark Hall of Fame.

Sherman made his film debut in One Third of a Nation (1939). His feature films include The Solid Gold Cadillac, Mary, Mary, in which he reprised his role in the play, and Oh Dad, Poor Dad, Mamma's Hung You in the Closet and I'm Feelin' So Sad.

Sherman died of a stroke in Springfield, Illinois in 1989, aged 81.
