= Triple-A Plowed Under =

1936 play produced by the Federal Theatre Project

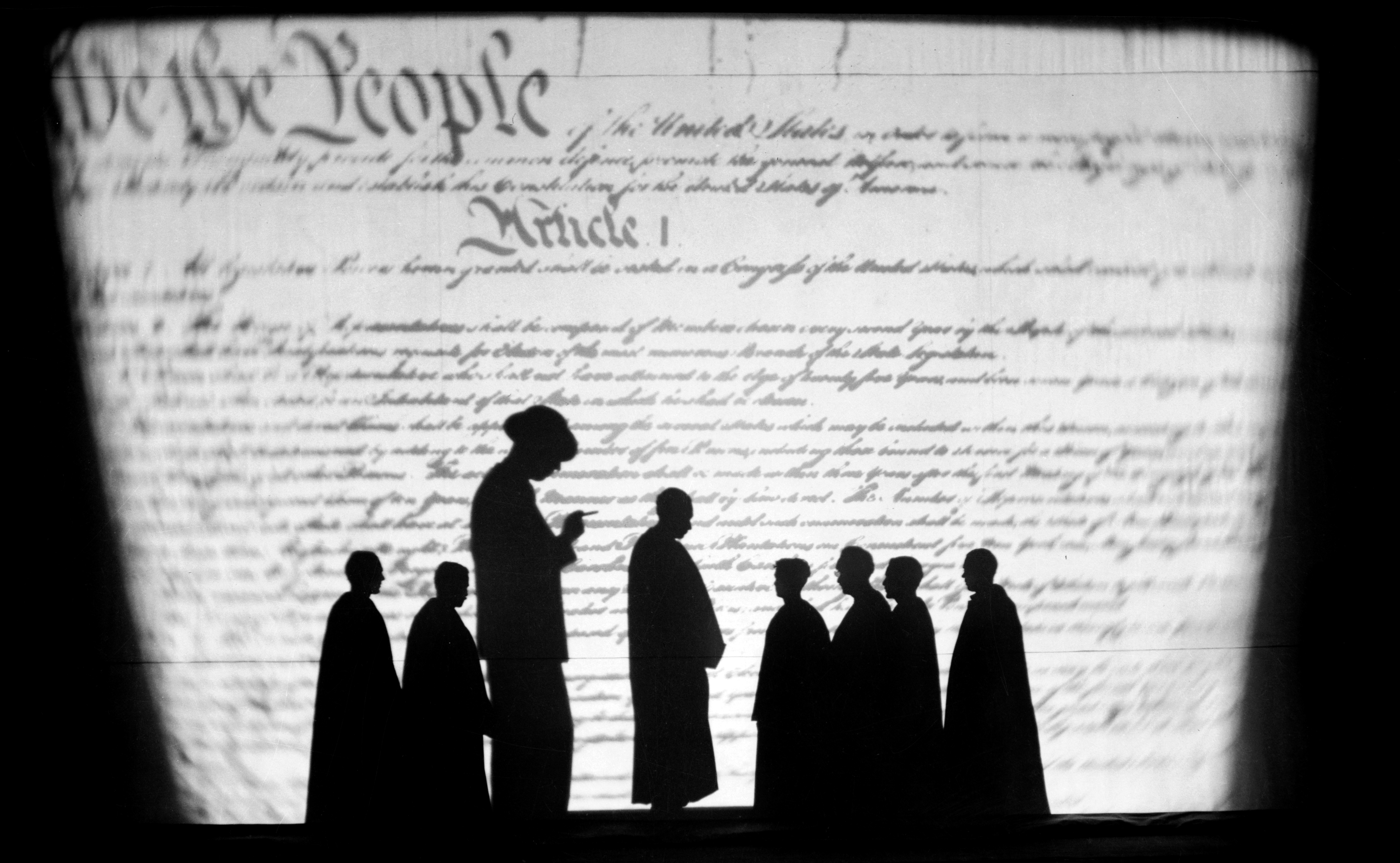
Al Smith and the Supreme Court silhouetted against the Constitution of the United States, a scene in Triple-A Plowed Under (1936)

Triple-A Plowed Under is a Living Newspaper play produced by the Federal Theatre Project in 1936. Written by Arthur Arent from research by the editorial staff of the Federal Theatre Project and directed by Joseph Losey, it focused on the Agricultural Adjustment Act of 1933 and the plight of Dust Bowl farmers. The production premiered on Broadway at the Biltmore Theatre on March 14, 1936, and ran until May 2, 1936.

== Background ==
The Federal Theatre Project, directed by Hallie Flanagan, was created in 1935 as one of the Works Project Administration's five Federal Project Number One projects to provide relief for unemployed actors, artists, writers, directors and theater workers during the Great Depression. They made use of the theatrical genre known as the Living Newspaper, which used drama to provide the public with information on social issues and current events.

During World War I, American farmers were urged to increase crop production and stock-pile agricultural products to provide aid for Europe, which resulted in a surplus after the war was over. As a result of the Smoot-Hawley tariff in 1930, farmers found it difficult to generate income from this surplus. In the midst of the Great Depression, the Agricultural Adjustment Act (AAA) was brought into law as part of the New Deal for the purpose of raising the value of crops by offering farmers subsidies in return for not planting on part of their land. However, the act was quickly declared unconstitutional by the Supreme Court as it violated the Tenth Amendment, with Justice Owen Roberts stating that the federal government was invading areas of jurisdiction reserved by the constitution to the states by regulating agriculture.

== Summary ==
Presented through a cohesive series of twenty six scenes derived from several news events and narrated by a disembodied voice that provided commentary on the action referred to as the "Voice of the Living Newspaper," Triple-A Plowed Under criticized the AAA, and suggested that farmers and laborers work together to avoid the "middlemen" who had their own commercial interests in mind.

Vignettes include the devaluation of crops as a result of surplus after World War I, farm foreclosures after the decrease in demand left farmers unable to pay mortgages, auctions held in desperate attempts to make more money, the deliberate destruction of crops, the devastation brought on by the Dust Bowl and the drought that followed, the organization of farmer-consumer cooperatives, the establishment of the AAA, the Supreme Court's verdict, and the banding together of workers and farmers against dealers and other greedy middlemen.

=== Scenes ===
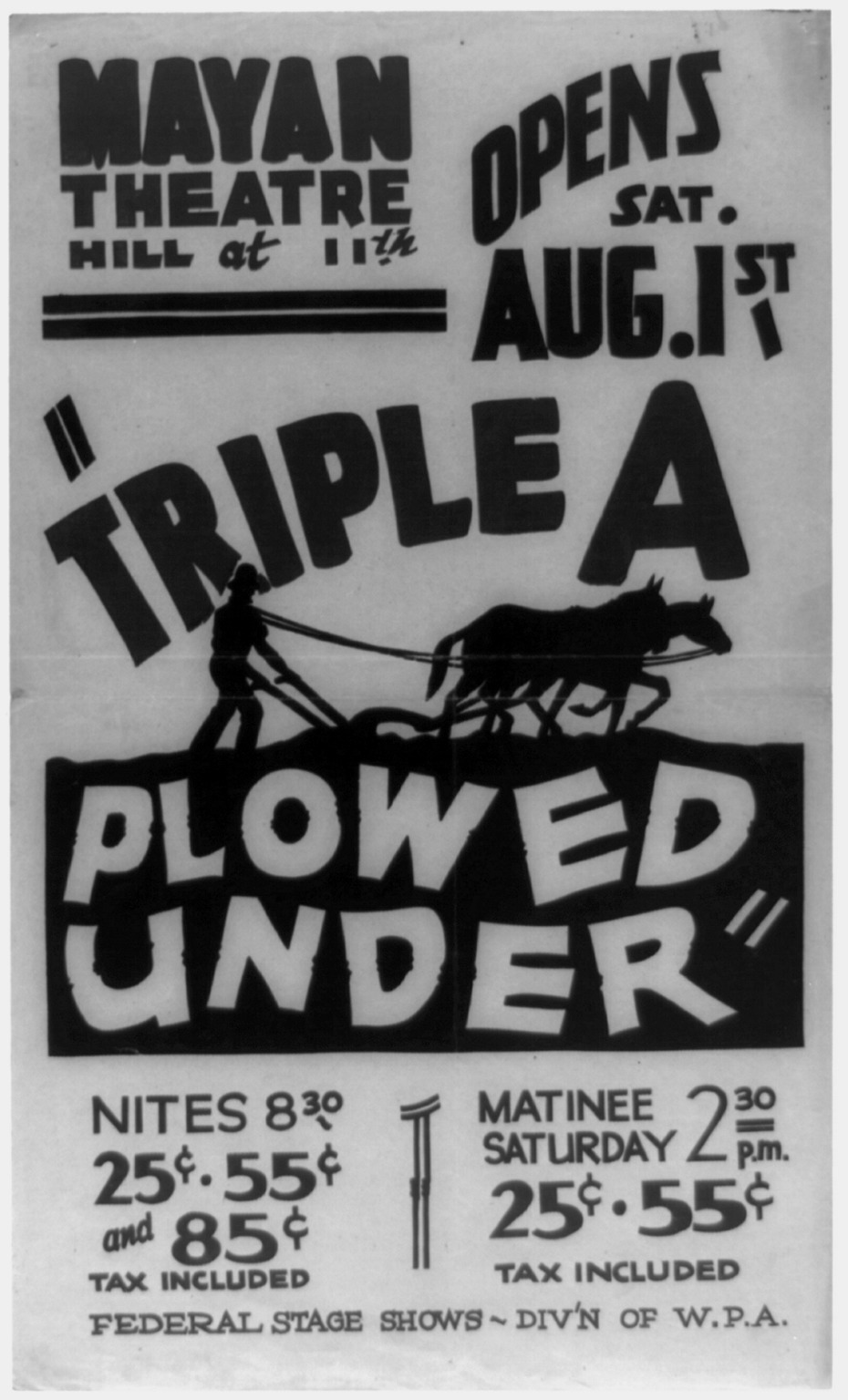

| | Title |
|---|---|
| One | "War and Inflation" |
| Two | "Deflation" |
| Three | "Farmer, Dealer, Manufacturer, Worker-Vicious Circle" |
| Four | "Farmers' Holiday" |
| Five | "Milk Prices" |
| Six | "Sioux City-Farmers Organize" |
| Seven | "Milk Strike" |
| Eight | "Farm Auction" |
| Nine | "Lem Harris, Secretary of the Farmers' National Relief Conference" |
| Ten | "Farm and City Families" |
| Eleven | "Triple-A Enacted" |
| Twelve | "Shirt Scene" |
| Thirteen | "Wheat Pit" |
| Fourteen | "Counter Restaurant" |
| Fifteen | "Park Avenue Restaurant" |
| Sixteen | "Drought" |
| Seventeen | "Church" |
| Eighteen | "Wheat Pit" |
| Nineteen | "Cotton Patch" |
| Twenty | "Sharecroppers" |
| Twenty-One | "Meat Strike" |
| Twenty-Two | "Mrs. Dorothy Sherwood" |
| Twenty-Three | "Supreme Court ... AAA killed" |
| Twenty-Four | "The Big "Steal"" |
| Twenty-Five | "Soil Conservation" |
| Twenty-Six | "Finale" |

== External sources ==
- Triple-A Plowed Under - image at Library of Congress
