= Living Newspaper =

Theatrical form

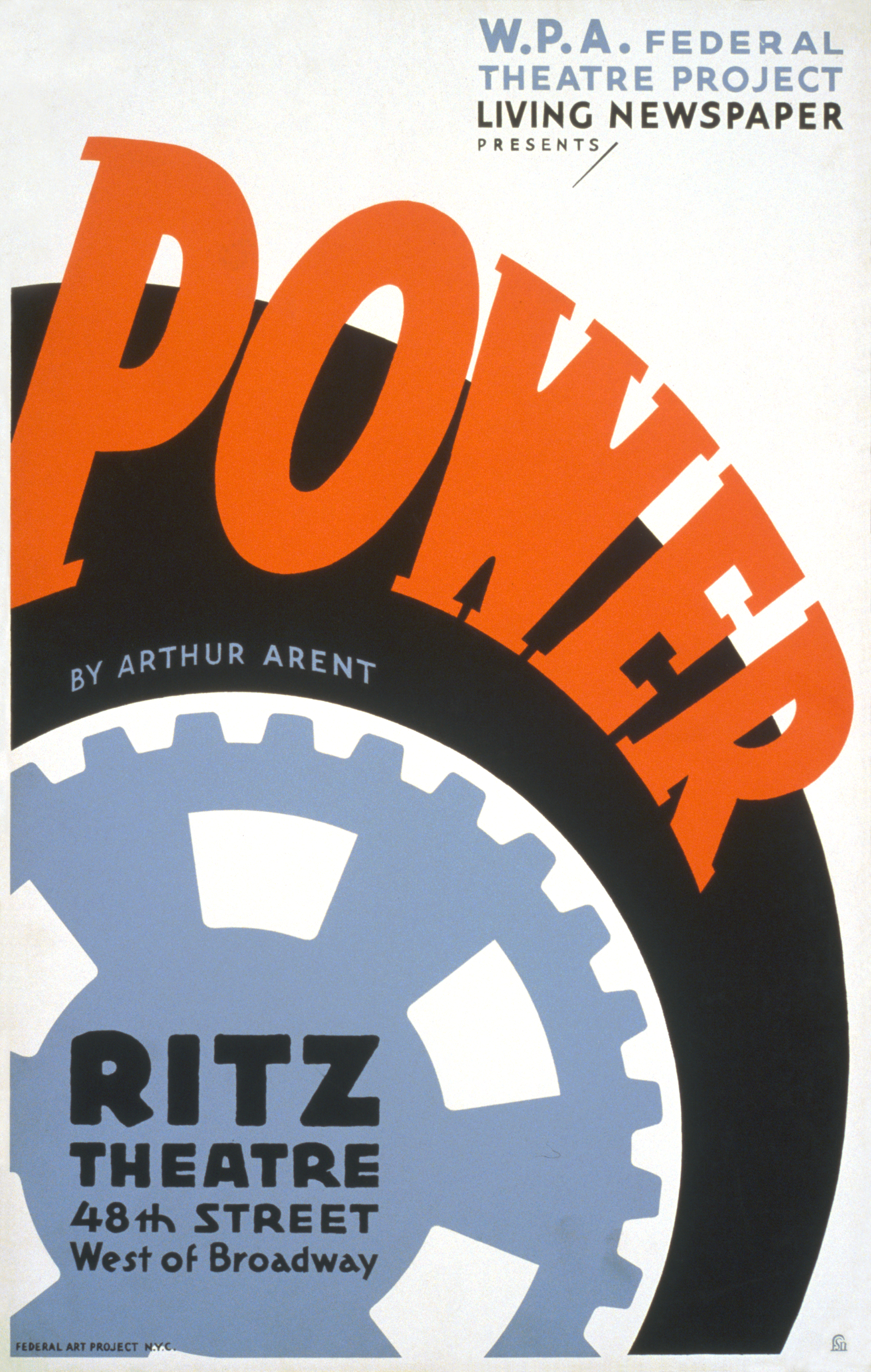
Poster for Power, a Living Newspaper play for the Federal Theatre Project (1937)

Living Newspaper is a theatrical form presenting factual information on current events to a popular audience. Historically, Living Newspapers have also urged social action (both implicitly and explicitly) and reacted against naturalistic and realistic theatrical conventions in favor of the more direct, experimental techniques of agitprop theatre, including the extensive use of multimedia. The term is most often associated with the Living Newspaper productions of the Federal Theatre Project (1935–1939), a New Deal work-relief program established under the Works Progress Administration.

The Federal Theatre Project wrote and presented a number of Living Newspapers on social issues of the day, including Triple-A Plowed Under, Injunction Granted, One-Third of a Nation, Power and Spirochete. Controversy over political ideology contributed to the disbanding of the Federal Theatre Project in 1939, and a number of Living Newspaper plays already written or in development were never performed, including several that addressed race issues.

== History ==
Like all so-called new forms the Living Newspaper borrows with fine impartiality from many sources: from Aristophanes, from the Commedia dell' Arte, from Shakespearean soliloquy, from the pantomime of Mei Lan Fang. Being a flexible technique and only in its beginning, it still has much to learn from the chorus, the camera, the cartoon. Although it has occasional reference to the Volksbühne and the Blue Blouses, to Bragaglia and Meierhold and Eisenstein, it is as American as Walt Disney, The March of Time and the Congressional Record, to all of which American institutions it is indebted.

— Hallie Flanagan, National Director of the Federal Theatre Project

The developers of the WPA Living Newspapers built upon theatrical forms they had encountered in Bolshevik Russia, Germany, and European workers' theatre. Living-Newspaper-like performances appeared in Bolshevik Russia as early as 1919, using a variety of devices (such as lantern slides, songs, newspaper readings, and film segments) to present news and propaganda to the illiterate. As the form matured in Russia, workers' groups put on highly regionalized Living Newspapers, treating issues of public interest and concern. Zhivaya Gazeta (the Russian term for "Living Newspaper") reached its peak from 1923 to 1928; Hallie Flanagan, director of the Federal Theatre Project, had visited the country and witnessed workers' performances during this period, in 1926. The Blue Blouse theatre groups, which employed satire and demanding acrobatics to bring news to the public, particularly captured Flanagan's attention. The work of Russian theatre artists Vsevolod Meyerhold and Vladimir Mayakovsky, active during this time, also influenced the form, as did the work of German theatre artists Bertolt Brecht and Erwin Piscator.

== Living Newspaper division of the Federal Theatre Project ==
=== Establishment of the NY Living Newspaper Unit and Ethiopia ===
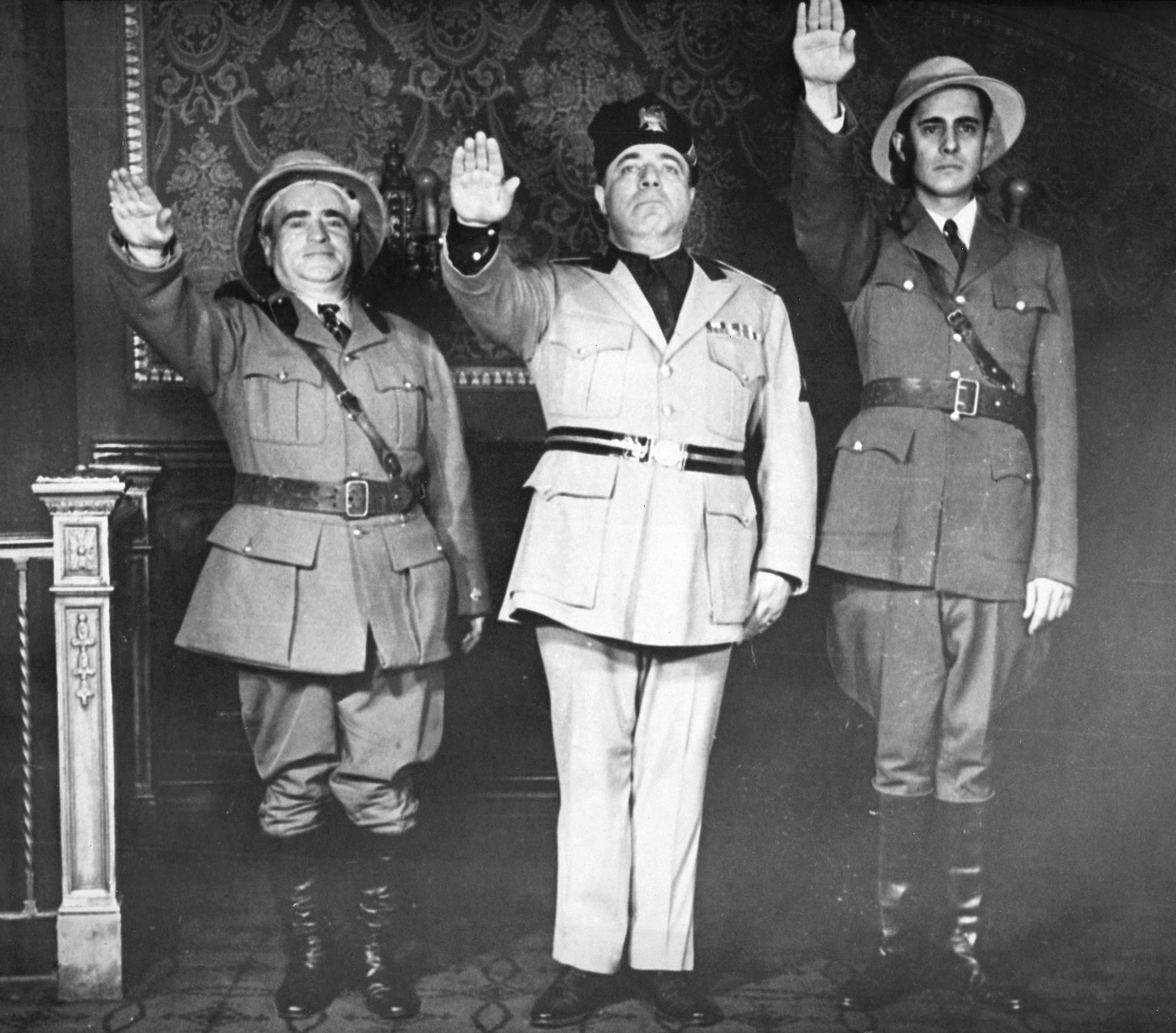
Frank Marino as Mussolini with two other cast members in the first Living Newspaper production, Ethiopia, which was abandoned prior to its opening on January 29, 1936

The Living Newspaper program began very shortly after the establishment of the Federal Theatre Project. Following her appointment as National Director of the FTP in July 1935, Hallie Flanagan, a professor and playwright at Vassar College, and playwright Elmer Rice set to work planning the organization and focus of the FTP. The New York Living Newspaper Unit (which performed at the Biltmore Theatre) came from this meeting. Allied with the American Newspaper Guild, this first and most active of the Living Newspaper Units employed out-of-work journalists and theatre professionals of all types, providing hourly wages for many reporters and entertainers left unemployed by the Depression.

The research staff of the Living Newspaper Unit quickly compiled their first Living Newspaper, Ethiopia, which went into rehearsal in 1936. It never opened to the public. The federal government issued a censorship order prohibiting the impersonation of heads of state onstage; the order effectively scuttled the production, which dramatized the invasion of Ethiopia by Italy and featured Italian dictator Benito Mussolini and other real-life figures prominently as characters. Elmer Rice withdrew from the FTP in protest.

=== Controversy: Triple-A Plowed Under and Injunction Granted ===
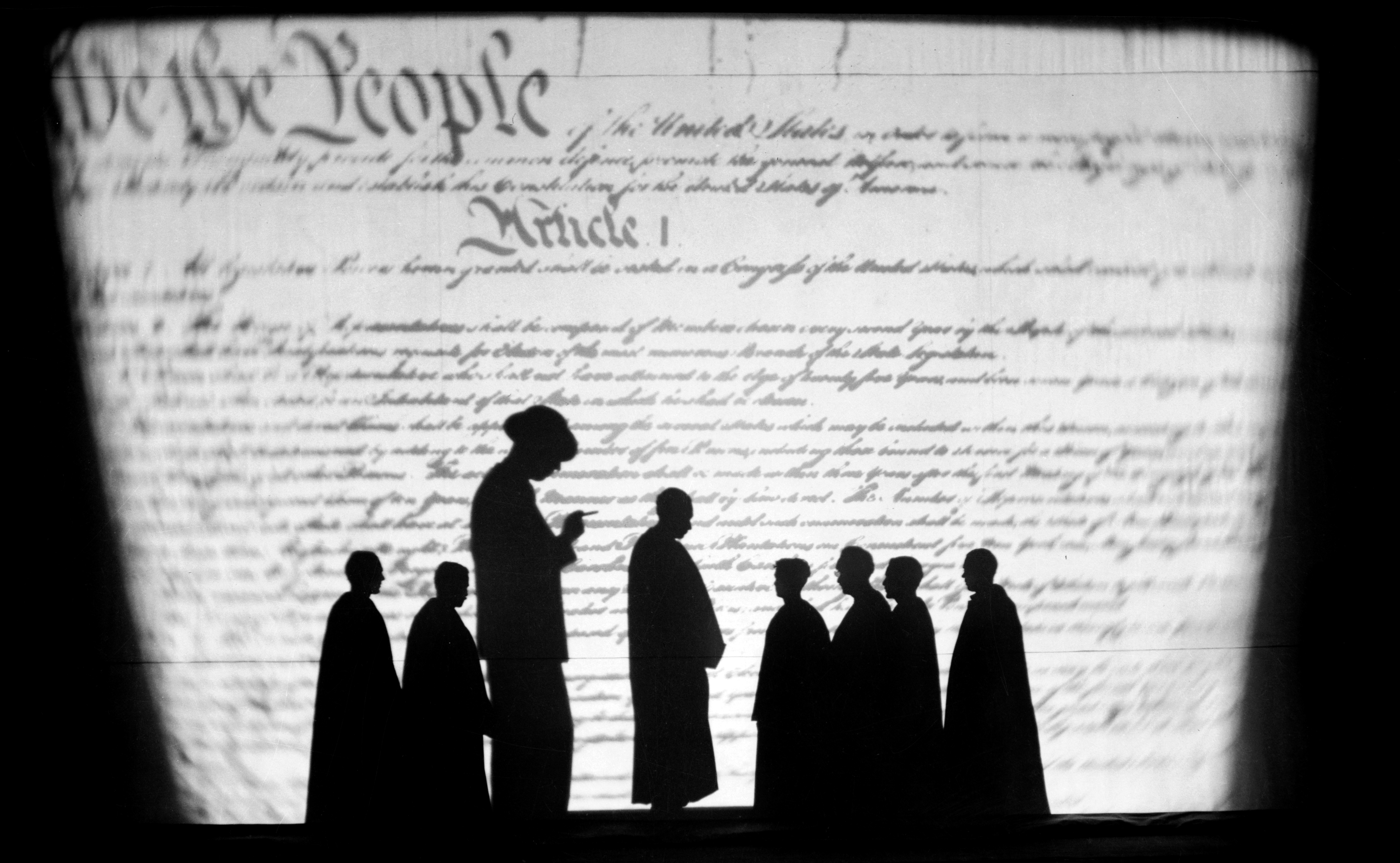
Al Smith and the Supreme Court are silhouetted against the United States Constitution in a scene from Triple-A Plowed Under (1936)

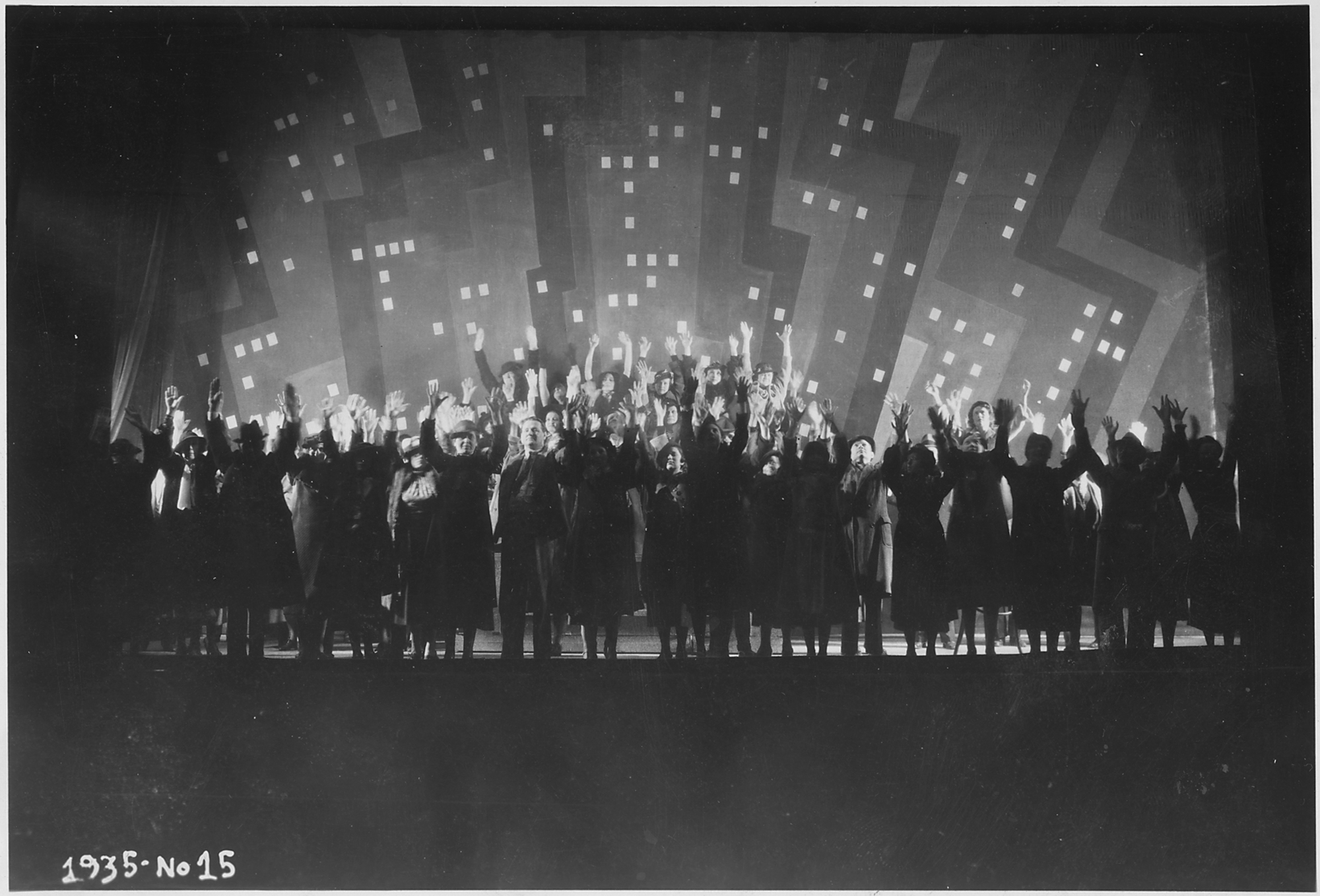
Highlights of 1935 (1936)

Left with no script and the pressing need to provide its performers with a play, the Unit drew up another Living Newspaper, Triple-A Plowed Under, within a matter of weeks. Morale had dropped after the cancellation of Ethiopia, and the original director of Triple-A Plowed Under left in frustration; Joseph Losey, known for his support of the Communist Party and recently returned from a visit to Moscow, replaced him. Triple-A Plowed Under dramatized the plight of Dust Bowl farmers and suggested that farmers and workers unite to cut out the "middlemen"—dealers and other commercial interests. The "Triple-A" in the title came from the Agricultural Adjustment Act of 1933, which the play criticized. Like other Living Newspapers to follow, it employed the Voice of the Living Newspaper, a disembodied voice that commented on and narrated the action; shadows; image projections; elaborate sound design, with sound effects and music; abrupt blackouts and scene changes; and other non-realistic devices to keep the audience's attention and support the message of the play.

1935 (May 12–30, 1936) followed Triple-A Plowed Under. An uncharacteristic Living Newspaper as it had no point of view, it strung together the year's events through the device of a universal chorus of average citizens—most notably a jury in the trial of Bruno Hauptmann. Despite a few effective scenes, it was the least successful of the Living Newspapers.

Though Triple-A had clearly criticized government decisions and supported the laborer over the "merchant," the Unit's third Living Newspaper, also directed by Losey, explicitly supported workers' organizations and angered members of the federal government. Injunction Granted, which opened four months after the close of Triple-A, lampooned big business men such as H. J. Heinz and newspaper baron William Randolph Hearst and called for unions to join the Congress of Industrial Organizations (CIO), a major, militant workers' association. It aroused government concern during rehearsal; and Hallie Flanagan urged Losey to re-write parts of the script, but the play made it to the stage largely unaltered. The piece ran on over-the-top satire and explicit bias: Heinz was introduced holding a giant pickle; Dean Jennings of the Newspaper Guild trounced Hearst in a boxing match; and a clown (played by actor Norman Lloyd) served as master-of-ceremonies for the entire production, according to Cosgrove. Injunction Granted drew massive criticism and closed early. Losey soon left the Unit and the FTP, though Flanagan offered to give him another chance.

=== The turnaround: Power and One-Third of a Nation ===
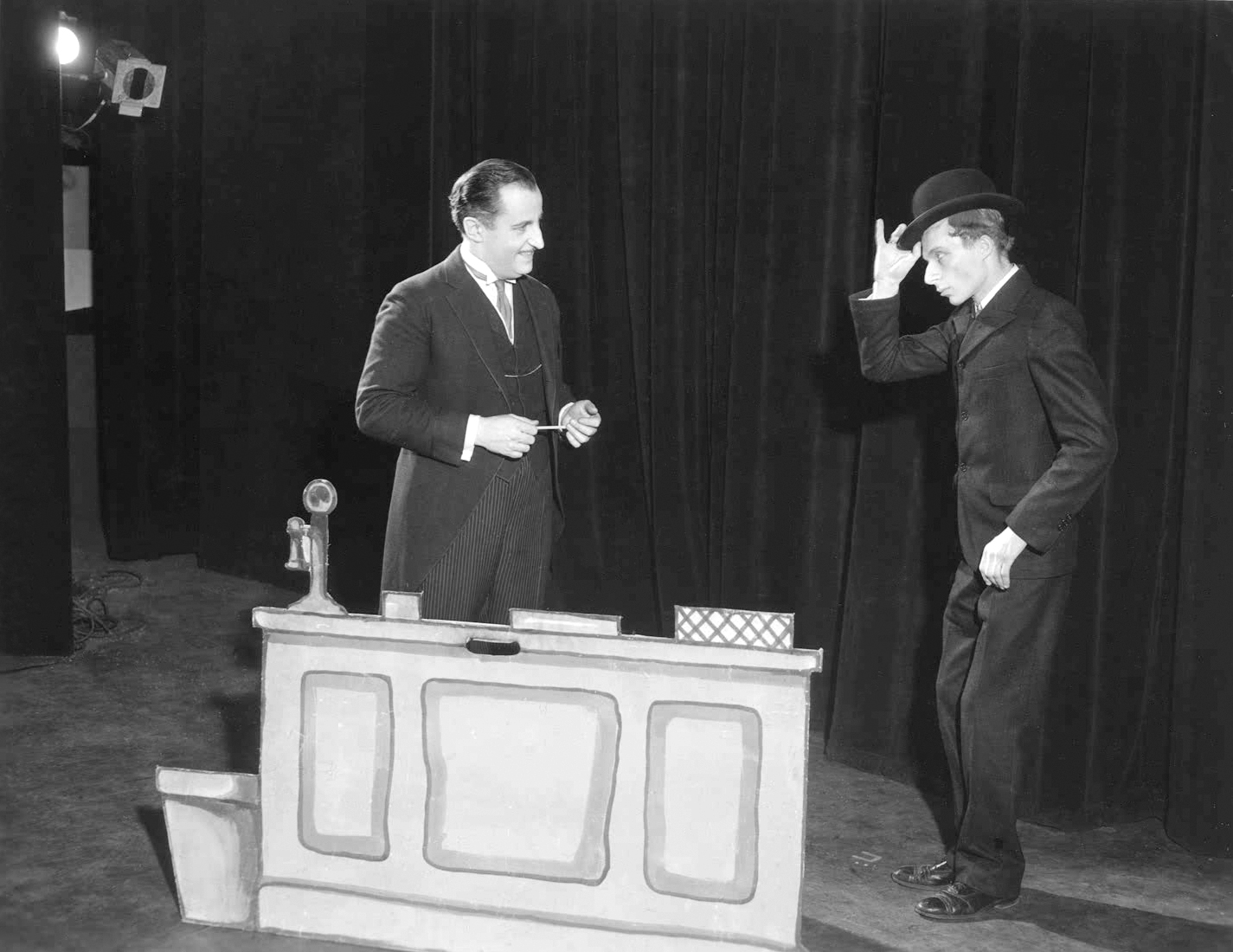
The Consumer (Norman Lloyd, right) discovers there is only one electric company that he can deal with in the New York production of Power (1937).

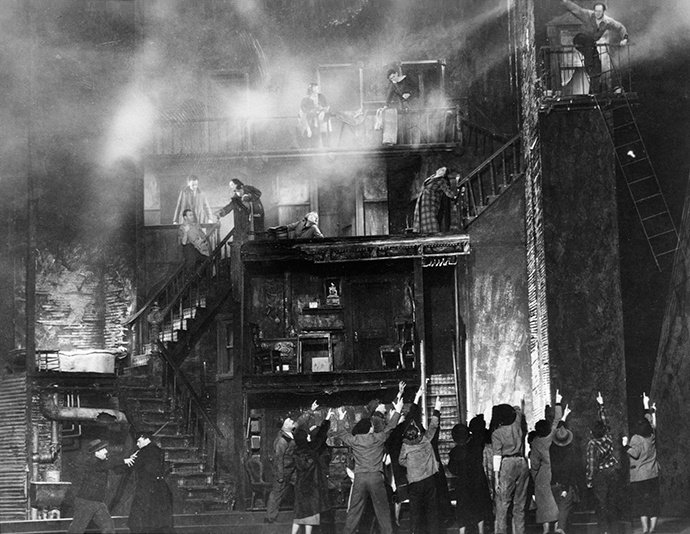
Howard Bay's set and the fatal fire in the tenement that begins One-Third of a Nation (1938), the most successful of the Living Newspaper productions

Here is a play that has no hero, or heroine, that has no great figure or fanciful character ... Here is a play about you.

— Promotional materials for Seattle's production of the Living Newspaper Power.

With the censorship of Ethiopia and the negative reaction to Injunction Granted, the Living Newspaper Unit had twice attracted criticism from the government that funded it. In order to continue as a federal program, it became more retrospect and less politically radical in its choice of topics but did not give up its dedication to reportage on major social issues and calls for social change.

Its first production following Injunction Granted demonstrated this new emphasis. Opening early in 1937, Power clearly supported the policies of the New Deal and the Works Progress Administration. Power chronicled the search of the public consumer for affordable electric power and held up the Tennessee Valley Authority project as an example of where such power could come from. The play also introduced the "little man" figure to the Living Newspaper—a character who represented the consumer and the public, appearing throughout the play, asking questions and receiving explanations. Power garnered a positive reception, running for 140 performances and then converting to a scaled-down travelling form for outdoors summer performances throughout the city.

"In Power, the struggle inherent in all Living Newspapers becomes, through the character of the Consumer, more explicit," wrote Hallie Flanagan. "It is the struggle of the average citizen to understand the natural, social and economic forces around him, and to achieve through these forces, a better life for more people."

The next Living Newspaper also met with public and critical success. Over the summer of 1937, Flanagan oversaw the Federal Theatre Project Summer School at Vassar College; the 40 theatre artists invited to this program developed the first version of a Living Newspaper on tenant housing which grew to become One-Third of a Nation. In its finished form, One-Third of a Nation opened early in 1938 and ran for 237 performances, making it the most successful of the Living Newspapers. The play abandoned some of the experimental nature of the earlier Living Newspapers, using a very realistic set to display the filth and dangers of a tenant slum, but retained the episodic format and multimedia (sound, film, and image) displays that characterized the form. The production received praise from critics and may have helped push through housing legislation. It eventually opened in major cities throughout the country, and was adapted for a 1939 feature film by Paramount Pictures. It was the first Federal Theatre Project play to be sold to the film industry. One-Third of a Nation was revived in 2011 by the Metropolitan Playhouse in New York City.

=== The end of the FTP and the Living Newspaper Unit ===
Despite its rising success and less radical tone, the tide of government opinion turned against the Federal Theatre Project – and the Living Newspapers in particular – in 1938. Established in this year, the House Un-American Activities Committee (HUAC) began an investigation of the FTP, focusing on its alleged Communist sympathies and anti-American propagandism. Flanagan defended the FTP and the Living Newspapers, holding that the program had presented propaganda, yes, but "... propaganda for democracy, propaganda for better housing," not propaganda against the government. Despite her defense of the program and President Roosevelt's protests, Congress disbanded the FTP – and with it, the New York Living Newspaper Unit – on July 30, 1939.

The end of the FTP and the Unit left many complete and partially developed Living Newspaper scripts unperformed and unfinished. Among these were three by African-American playwrights that dealt with race issues and racism, including Liberty Deferred, by Abram Hill and John Silvera, which followed the history of slavery in the U.S. and addressed the lynchings of African-Americans in the South. Some historians suggest that Congress shut down the Federal Theatre Project partially to stifle the voices of African-American theatre professionals and criticism of racism in the U.S., or that the FTP delayed production of these plays out of fear of just such a reprisal.

The Living Newspaper project has influenced progressive theatre in the 21st century. A good example of a theatre company performing in the style of the Living Newspaper is the progressive DC Theatre Collective whose piece, The Tea Party Project, was performed in Washington DC in July 2010.

=== Living Newspapers outside of New York ===
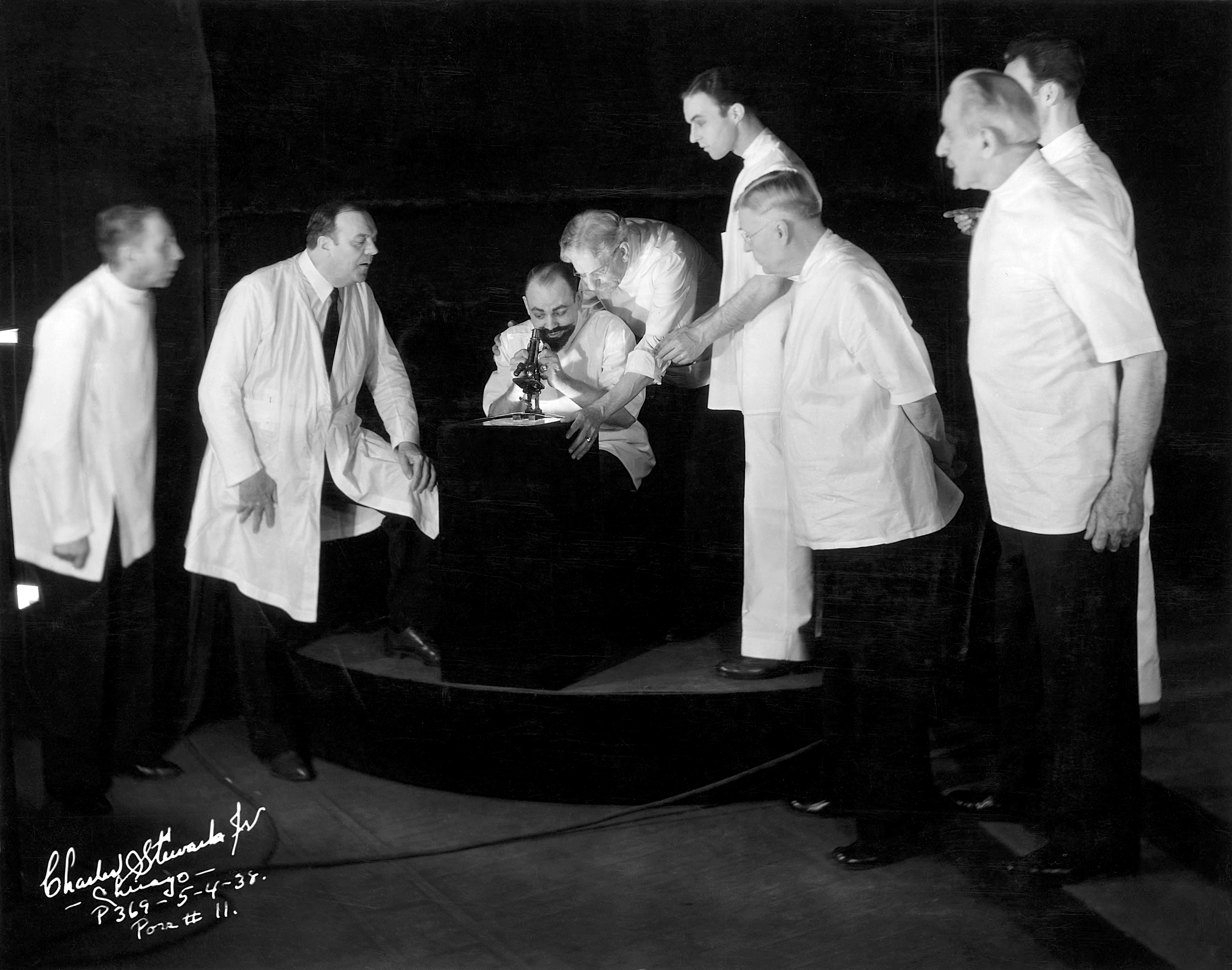
The long-sought spirillum is finally isolated in the original production of Spirochete: A History (1938) at the Blackstone Theatre in Chicago.

Though the New York Living Newspaper Unit produced most of the major Living Newspapers, other units in cities throughout the U.S. produced or planned Living Newspapers. In most cases, these productions were local runs of the New York Living Newspapers. Both Power and One-Third of a Nation ran throughout the U.S., with the scripts altered to various degrees to suit local conditions. In Seattle, the mayor declared "Power Week" in honor of the week-long run of Power, recognizing the timeliness of the play's subject matter: With the public Bonneville hydroelectric project on the horizon, private and public power companies were vying for support in the city.

Non-New-York Units also researched and wrote their own Living Newspapers. The Southwest Unit, in California, planned and researched Spanish Grant, on a historical incident in which a series of "speculative land deals" took land from communities, and Land Grant, on the 1848 cession of California to the United States and corrupt land deals that led up to it. Washington's unit planned Timber; Iowa's Dirt; and Connecticut's Stars and Bars; however, none of these regional Living Newspapers ever made it to full production.

On the other hand, Chicago produced an original Living Newspaper that rivalled those of New York in its impact and positive reception. In 1938, Arnold Sundgaard's Spirochete, a Living Newspaper on the history of syphilis, opened in Chicago. Using the image projections, extensive sound design, shadowplay, brief scenes, and "little man" character (here, a patient embodying all syphilis sufferers throughout history) made standard by the New York Unit, Spirochete followed syphilis from its introduction in Europe in the 15th century through to the social stigma surrounding it in the 1930s. The play promoted support for premarital medical examination laws, which required blood tests for syphilis prior to marriage. Spirochete became the second most-produced Living Newspaper, after One-Third of a Nation and ran in four other major cities as part of a nationwide syphilis education-and-prevention campaign.

=== Style of the FTP's Living Newspapers ===
The Living Newspaper is a dramatization of a problem – composed in greater or lesser extent of many news events, all bearing on the one subject and interlarded with typical but non-factual representations of the effect of these news events on the people to whom the problem is of great importance.

— Arthur Arent, attributed author of many of the FTP's Living Newspapers.

Though definitions of the Living Newspaper and its purpose, both within the Federal Theatre Project and at large, varied, certain characteristics united all of the FTP's Living Newspaper productions.

First, a Living Newspaper's content always centered on some current event or issue affecting the United States working class at large – whether it be the spread of syphilis, slum housing conditions, or the search for affordable electrical power. Teams of research workers, many of whom were out-of-work journalists, carried out extensive research to provide the factual base for each Living Newspaper. Editors then organized the information and turned it over to writers, who collectively assembled a Living Newspaper from this collage of facts, statistics, newspaper clippings, and anecdotes. Though Hallie Flanagan repeatedly stated that Living Newspapers should be objective and unbiased, most Living Newspaper productions communicated a clear bias and a call for action from the watching audience.

Second, the FTP's Living Newspapers tended to break from realistic stage conventions in favor of non-naturalistic, experimental dramaturgy and stage design. "Techniques Available to the Living Newspaper Dramatist," a guide compiled by the Federal Theatre Project in 1938, lists many of the elements that became characteristic of the Living Newspaper. These included quick scene and set changes; flexibility of stage space, using many levels, rolling and hand-carried scenery, and scrims to establish a multitude of locations without elaborate constructed sets; projection of settings, statistics, and film; shadowplay; sound effects and full musical scores; the use of a loudspeaker to narrate and comment on the action; and abrupt blackouts and harsh spotlights. The guide also suggests the use of puppetry, modern dance, and pantomime. In terms of dramatic construction, the guide urges writers and designers to keep the concept of counterpoint in mind when constructing Living Newspapers—alternating quickly between scenes and voices displaying contrasting viewpoints, to comment on the action and keep the audience involved and aware.

== See also ==
- Theatre of the Oppressed

== Sources ==
- Cosgrove, Stuart. Introduction. Liberty Deferred and Other Living Newspapers of the 1930s. Federal Theatre Project. Ed. Lorraine Brown. Fairfax: George Mason UP, 1989. ix-xxv.
- Cosgrove, Stuart. The Living Newspaper: History, Production, and Form. Hull: University of Hull, 1982.
- George Mason University Special Collections & Archives. "Federal Theatre Project Poster, Costume, and Set Design Slide Collection." Special Collections & Archives: George Mason University Libraries. George Mason University. 28 Oct. 2007 <>.
- Hill, Abram and John Silvera. Liberty Deferred. Liberty Deferred and Other Living Newspapers of the 1930s. Ed. Lorraine Brown. Fairfax: George Mason UP, 1989. 249–303.
- The Library of Congress. American Memory. 13 Aug. 2007. The Government of the United States. 28 Oct. 2007 <American Memory: Remaining Collections>.
- Nadler, Paul. "Liberty Censored: Black Living Newspapers of the Federal Theatre Project." African American Review 29 (1995): 615–622.
- O'Connor, John S. "'Spirochete' and the War on Syphilis." The Drama Review 21.1 (1977): 91–98.
- Witham, Barry B. The Federal Theatre Project: A Case Study. Cambridge Studies in American Theatre and Drama. Ser. 20. New York: Cambridge UP, 2003.
