= Arthur Arent =

American playwright (1904–1972)

- Born: September 29, 1904
- Died: May 18, 1972 (aged 67)
- Citizenship: American
- Occupation: Playwright

Arthur Arent (1904–1972) was a 20th-Century American playwright of the twentieth century among whose works are the 1936 Living Newspaper play Triple-A Plowed Under.

== Background ==
Arthur Arent was born on September 29, 1904, in Jersey City, New Jersey. He studied at Lafayette College and New York University.

== Career ==
In the mid-1930s, Arent began working with the Federal Theatre Project (FTP), a New Deal agency. He was appointed as a creative drama writer specializing in "Living Newspaper". The first of these plays was 1935 which opened at the Biltmore Theatre on May 12, 1936. He wrote Triple-A Plowed Under for the FTP, which was performed in 1936. Other plays included: Ethiopia (1935), Power (1937), and One Third of a Nation (1938).

In 1937, Arent worked with Marc Blitzstein, Emanuel Eisenberg, Charles Friedman, and David Gregory on the magazine Pins and Needles of the International Ladies Garment Workers Union (ILGwU).

In 1938, the Guggenheim Foundation awarded him a fellowship in playwriting.

In the early 1940s during World War II, Arent wrote for Warner Brothers and then worked in the US Office of War Information.

== Personal life and death ==
Arendt married Blanche Englander.

Arthur Arent died on May 18, 1972.

== Works ==
Arent produced 59 works and worked on plays and adaptations for theater, radio, and television, as well fiction publications. Radio works appeared on National Broadcasting Company (NBC) and "The Theatre Guild on the Air" presented by the United States Steel Corporation and "The Cavalcade of America" presented by DuPont. Television works appeared on "The United States Steel Hour", and "The General Electric Theater." He also wrote three novels.
