= Painted Smiles Records =

Record label based in New York City, USA

Painted Smiles Records was a small record label, based in New York City and run by Ben Bagley, which operated from the 1970s to the 1990s. It is best known for its Revisited series of recordings of little-known songs by well-known songwriters.

== History ==
=== Genesis ===
During Ben Bagley's long stay in a hospital while recovering from tuberculosis, his best friend Arthur Siegel brought him tapes of little-known songs by great Broadway songwriters. Bagley was inspired to produce his own recordings of such songs, initially for existing record labels. In 1971, he founded his own label, Painted Smiles Records. Painted Smiles released cast recordings of Bagley's own revues and of historical and contemporary Broadway musicals, and many collections of those little-known songs.

=== The Revisited series ===
Most Painted Smiles recordings, most titled ... Revisited, were anthologies of the lesser-known songs of the top Broadway musical composers and lyricists from the 1920s through the 1940s, including Harold Arlen, Irving Berlin, Leonard Bernstein, Noël Coward, DeSylva, Brown and Henderson, Vernon Duke, George and Ira Gershwin, Oscar Hammerstein II, Yip Harburg, Jerome Kern, Alan Jay Lerner, Frank Loesser, Johnny Mercer, Cole Porter, Rodgers and Hart, Arthur Schwartz, Kurt Weill and Vincent Youmans.

The Revisited albums shared a distinctive design. Their covers displayed bright watercolors by Harvey Schmidt (better known as a composer) of showgirls in improbable and sometimes surreal costumes, often naked or nearly so above or even below the waist, on white backgrounds. (Note: Shoestring Revue's cover art was signed by Yves Saint Laurent, that for Mostly Mercer by Bob Mackie, and that for Bart!, and inside art for Cole Porter Revisited Vol. V, by Joe Eula. For citations of each of those albums, see Discography § Compact discs.) Their backs were crammed with Bagley's detailed, witty, gossipy and occasionally ribald liner notes, bylined "by Ben Bagley (who is incurably insane)", and small photographs of the performers.

The Revisited series featured performances by some of the leading Broadway performers of the day (Nancy Andrews, Kaye Ballard, Barbara Cook, Helen Gallagher, Dolores Gray, Tammy Grimes, Dorothy Loudon, Estelle Parsons, Anthony Perkins, Chita Rivera, Elaine Stritch), cabaret and jazz singers (Ann Hampton Callaway, Cab Calloway, Blossom Dearie, Mary Cleere Haran, Bobby Short) and many great theatre and film actors and other personalities not generally known for their singing ability, among them Ellen Burstyn, Martin Charnin, Richard Chamberlain, Phyllis Diller, Sheldon Harnick, Laurence Harvey, Katharine Hepburn, Lynn Redgrave, Rex Reed, Joan Rivers, Jerry Stiller and Gloria Swanson.

Playbill called Bagley's liner notes for the Revisited albums "odd and iconoclastic" and the albums themselves "hardly scholarly and sometimes downright unpleasant to listen to (note the antic, drowsy, caffeinated, tinny arrangements and uneven voices — a festival of sharps and flats)". However, "the discs are nonetheless embraced by fans hungry to explore old, mothballed material by extraordinary songwriters".

=== Production ===
In its first decades Painted Smiles released its recordings on vinyl. In the 1980s it began releasing CDs, and re-released many of its earlier recordings on CD (distributed by its division Battery Records). Many Painted Smiles releases have been re-released, with improved sound, by Kritzerland Records.

Painted Smiles' first logo ("Suck Lips"), used on the labels (not the jackets) of its LPs, was a pair of lipsticked lips suggestively encircling the spindle hole. Its second logo ("Serpent Siren"), used on CDs, was a nude woman, standing, holding a snake's head and tail to form a capital P, with the rest of the label's name in cursive. Both logos were designed by Jerome Hill, who had put up the money to start the label.

== Discography ==
Titles of Bagley's revues and the Revisited series are prefixed with Bagley's name, but in a smaller font and different case indicating that it is not part of the title proper.

Except where noted, all complete entries were written by consulting a copy of the release. That is, each complete entry is its own citation.

=== Long-playing records ===
Except where noted, partial citations are taken from the list of releases on the back cover of E.Y. Harburg Revisited.

- Lola. US: Painted Smiles Records PS 1335.
- Alan Jay Lerner. US: Painted Smiles Records PS 1337.
- Miss Julie. US: Painted Smiles Records PS 1338.
- Kenward Elmslie Visited. US: Painted Smiles Records PS 1339.
- Cole Porter. US: Painted Smiles Records PS 1340.
- Rodgers & Hart Vol. 1. US: Painted Smiles Records PS 1341.
- Vernon Duke. US: Painted Smiles Records PS 1342.
- Rodgers & Hart Vol. 2. US: Painted Smiles Records PS 1343.
- Harold Arlen. US: Painted Smiles Records PS 1345.
- Arthur Schwartz. US: Painted Smiles Records PS 1350.
- Desylva, Brown, Henderson. US: Painted Smiles Records PS 1351.
- Vincent Youmans. US: Painted Smiles Records PS 1352.
- Ira Gershwin. US: Painted Smiles Records PS 1353.
- The Grass Harp. US: Painted Smiles Records PS 1354.
- Irving Berlin. US: Painted Smiles Records PS 1356.
- George Gershwin. US: Painted Smiles Records PS 1357.
- Unpublished Cole Porter. US: Painted Smiles Records PS 1358.
- Frank Loesser. US: Painted Smiles Records PS 1359.
- Shoestring Revues. US: Painted Smiles Records PS 1360.
- The Littlest Revue. US: Painted Smiles Records PS 1361.
- Shoestring '57. US: Painted Smiles Records PS 1362.
- Jerome Kern. US: Painted Smiles Records PS 1363.
- Ballet on Broadway. US: Painted Smiles Records PS 1364.
- Oscar Hammerstein. US: Painted Smiles Records PS 1365.
- Rodgers & Hart Vol. 3. US: Painted Smiles Records PS 1366.
- Rodgers & Hart Vol. 4. US: Painted Smiles Records PS 1367.
- R & H's Too Many Girls. US: Painted Smiles Records PS 1368.
- Make Mine Manhattan. US: Painted Smiles Records PS 1369.
- Cole Porter Vol. 3. US: Painted Smiles Records PS 1370.
- Cole Porter Vol. 4. US: Painted Smiles Records PS 1371.
- Various artists (1980). E.Y. Harburg Revisited (LP). New York, New York: Painted Smiles Records PS 1372. Features Carleton Carpenter, Blossom Dearie, Helen Gallagher, Tammy Grimes, Patrice Munsel, Arthur Siegel, Nancy Grennan Hillner, Patti Wyss and E.Y. Harburg.

=== Compact discs ===
All CDs released by Jackson Heights, NY: Painted Smiles Records.

- Various artists (1989). George Gershwin Revisited. PSCD-101. Featuring Barbara Cook, Bobby Short, Anthony Perkins and Elaine Stritch.
- Various artists (1989). The Grass Harp/Five Songs from Lola. PSCD-102. Featuring Barbara Cook, Carol Brice, Karen Morrow, Ruth Ford, Max Showalter, Russ Thacker, Christine Andreas, David Carroll, Jack Dabdoub and Judy Kaye.
- Various artists (1989). Mostly Mercer. PSCD-103. Reissued as Harbinger Records' HCD 1807.
- Studio cast (1989). Too Many Girls. PSCD-104. Featuring Nancy Andrews, Johnny Desmond, Estelle Parsons, Anthony Perkins, Nancy Grennan, Jerry Wyatt, Arthur Siegel and Ken Parks.
- Various artists (1989). Cole Porter Vol. III. PSCD-105. Featuring Georgia Engel, Helen Gallagher, Dolores Gray, Lynn Redgrave, Arthur Siegel, Elaine Stritch, Nancy Grennan and The Darktown Strutters.
- Various artists (1989). Rodgers and Hart Revisited Vol. III. PSCD-106. Featuring Nancy Andrews, Blossom Dearie, Johnny Desmond, Estelle Parsons, Anthony Perkins, Lynn Redgrave and Arthur Siegel.
- Various artists (1989). Leonard Bernstein Revisited. PSCD-107. Featuring Nell Carter, Estelle Parsons, John Reardon, Chita Rivera, Arthur Siegel, Jo Sullivan, Angelina Reaux, Maggie Task, Bob DeAngelis, Denis Nolan, Dennis Roberts and David Love Calloway.
- Various artists (1989). Kurt Weill Revisited. PSCD-108. Featuring Paula Laurence, Ann Miller, John Reardon, Chita Rivera, Arthur Siegel and Jo Sullivan.
- Various artists (1989). Kurt Weill Revisited Vol. II. PSCD-109. Featuring Ellen Burstyn, Nell Carter, Blossom Dearie, Tammy Grimes, Estelle Parsons, John Reardon, Arthur Siegel and Jo Sullivan.
- Various artists (1990). Noel Coward Revisited. PSCD-110. Featuring Laurence Harvey, Hermione Gingold, Nancy Andrews, Edward Earle and The Satisfactions. Bonus material featuring Ann Hampton Callaway, Myvanwy Jenn, Barbara Lea and Arthur Siegel.
- Various artists (1990). Jerome Kern Revisited Vol. II. PSCD-111. Featuring Kaye Ballard, Sheldon Harnick, Anne Meara, Arthur Siegel, Jerry Stiller, Joanne Woodward, Andy Anselmo, Jennifer Bassey, Karla Burns, John O'Hurley, Angelina Reaux, Sarah Rice, Mark Sendroff, Sandy Stewart, Blythe Walker, Karen Wyman and the Show Boat 1983 revival cast.
- Original off-Broadway cast (1989). The Littlest Revue. PSCD-112.
- Various artists (1990). Jerome Kern Revisited. PSCD-113. Featuring Barbara Cook, Nancy Andrews, Bobby Short, George Reinholt, Harold Lang and Cy Young. Bonus material ("previously released on the Painted Smiles recording Jerome Kern Revisited Vol. IV which will not be converted to compact disc") featuring Rod McKuen, Kaye Ballard and Henrietta Valor.
- Bart Howard, K.T. Sullivan, Julie Wilson and William Roy (undated). Bart! The Songs of Bart Howard. PSCD-114.
- Various artists (1990). Frank Loesser Revisited. PSCD-115. Featuring Blossom Dearie, Johnny Desmond, Rhonda Fleming, Madeline Kahn, Bibi Osterwald, Gloria Swanson and Margaret Whiting. Bonus material featuring Jo Sullivan, Colin Romoff and Emily Loesser.
- Various artists (1990). Rodgers and Hart Revisited. PSCD-116. Featuring Dorothy Loudon, Danny Meehan, Charlotte Rae and Cy Young. Bonus material featuring Ann Hampton Callaway, Arthur Siegel and Sandy Stewart.
- Various artists (1990). Cole Porter Revisited Vol. IV. PSCD-117. Featuring Katharine Hepburn, Blossom Dearie, Helen Gallagher, Dolores Gray, Patrice Munsel, Arthur Siegel and Kaye Ballard. Bonus material featuring Ann Hampton Callaway and Sandy Stewart.
- Various artists (1990). Irving Berlin Revisited. PSCD-118. Featuring Richard Chamberlain, Blossom Dearie, Dorothy Loudon, Bobby Short, William H. Elliot and Miles Kreuger. Bonus material featuring Ann Hampton Callaway, Arthur Siegel, Sandy Stewart, Rhonda Mae Callaway and William Cantor.
- Various artists (1990). Make Mine Manhattan + Great Revues Revisited. PSCD-119. Make Mine Manhattan featuring Helen Gallagher, Arthur Siegel, Bob DeAngelis, Dennis Deal, Estelle Parsons, Nancy Grennan and Ken Parks. Great Revues Revisited featuring Elaine Stritch, Ginger Ale, Lynn Redgrave, Patrick Dougherty, Nancy Andrews, Arthur Siegel, Carleton Carpenter, Dolores Gray, Christine Ranck, Robert Marks, William Cantor and Diane Carnevale.
- Studio cast (1990). Hold On to Your Hats. PSCD-120. Reissue of PS 1372. Featuring Carleton Carpenter, Blossom Dearie, Helen Gallagher, Tammy Grimes, Patrice Munsel, Arthur Siegel, Nancy Grennan Hillner, Patrice Munsel, Patti Wyss and E.Y. Harburg. Bonus material featuring Ali Robertson, William Cantor and Ann Hampton Callaway.
- Various artists (1990). Cole Porter Revisited. PSCD-121. Featuring David Allen, Kaye Ballard, Ronny Graham, Bibi Osterwald and Bobby Short. Bonus material featuring Ann Hampton Callaway, Arthur Siegel and Sandy Stewart.
- Various artists (1990). Cole Porter Revisited Vol. V. PSCD-122. Featuring Ann Hampton Callaway, Arthur Siegel, Sandy Stewart, Tommy Tune and Julie Wilson.
- Original off-Broadway cast (1991). The Decline and Fall of the Entire World as Seen Through the Eyes of Cole Porter. PSCD-124. Featuring Kaye Ballard, Harold Lang, William Hickey, Carmen Alvarez, Elmarie Wendel, Dody Goodman, Tammy Grimes, Bobby Short and Danny Meehan.
- Various artists (1991). Unpublished Cole Porter Vol. II. PSCD-125. Featuring Carmen Alvarez, Kaye Ballard, Blossom Dearie, Edward Earle, Laura Kenyon, Karen Morrow, Alice Playten and Charles Rydell.
- Various artists (1991). Rodgers and Hart Revisited Vol. IV. PSCD-126. Featuring Nancy Andrews, Blossom Dearie, Johnny Desmond, Anthony Perkins, Lynn Redgrave and Elaine Stritch.
- Various artists (1991). Harold Arlen and Vernon Duke Revisited Vol. II. PSCD-127. Featuring Blossom Dearie, Sandy Duncan, Helen Gallagher, Dolores Gray, Tammy Grimes, Arthur Siegel, Jamie Rocco. Bonus material featuring Sarah Knapp and Martin Charnin.
- Tallulah. PSCD-128.
- Original off-Broadway cast (1991). Shoestring Revue. PSCD-129. Featuring Beatrice Arthur, John Bartis, Ann Hampton Callaway, Danny Carroll, Jane Connell, Dody Goodman, Maxwell Grant, Dorothy Greener, Kristi Lynes, Robert Marks and Bill McCutcheon.
- Original off-Broadway cast (1991). Shoestring '57. PSCD-130. Featuring Beatrice Arthur, John Bartis, Fay de Witt, Dody Goodman, Dorothy Greener, Rich G. Wood. Bonus material featuring Michael Greenwood, Sheldon Harnick and Charles Strouse.
- Various artists (1991). Contemporary Broadway Revisited. PSCD-131. Featuring Katharine Hepburn, Alan Arkin, Kaye Ballard, Helen Gallagher, Anthony Perkins, John Reardon, Margaret Whiting, Judy Gilmer, Fay De Witt, Diane Carnevale, Mark Sendroff, Susan Stroman, Jan Newberger, K.T. Sullivan, Patricia Hoag and Harvey Schmidt.
- I Can't Keep Running In Place. PSCD-132.
- Original off-Broadway cast (1990). Catch Me If I Fall. PSCD-133.
- Various artists (1992). Jerome Kern Revisited Vol. III. PSCD-134. Compiles the Jerome Kern Revisited Vol. III and IV LPs. Featuring Kaye Ballard, Ann Hampton Callaway, Dody Goodman, Armelia McQueen, Angelina Reaux, Arthur Siegel, Blythe Walker, Susan Kreutzer, Sarah Rice, Craig Pomranz, Adelle Sardi, Ron Raines and Bruce Hubbard.
- Various artists (1992). Ira Gershwin Revisited. PSCD-135. Featuring Blossom Dearie, Mary McCarty, Danny Meehan, Charles Rydell, Ethel Shutta and Margaret Whiting. Bonus material featuring Dody Goodman, Paula Laurence, KT Sullivan, Robert Marks and Arthur Siegel.
- Various artists (1992). Oscar Hammerstein Revisited. PSCD-136. Featuring Cab Calloway, Blossom Dearie, Alfred Drake, E.Y. Harburg, Dorothy Loudon, Patrice Munsel, Elaine Stritch and Gloria Swanson.
- Various artists (1992). Arthur Schwartz Revisited. PSCD-137. Featuring Cab Calloway, Blossom Dearie, Gloria DeHaven, Phyllis Diller, Warde Donovan and Charles Rydell. Bonus material featuring Ethel Merman and Jimmy Durante.
- Various artists (1992). Vernon Duke Revisited. PSCD-138. Featuring Blossom Dearie, Gloria DeHaven, Tammy Grimes, Anthony Perkins, Rex Reed, Joan Rivers, the Keiffer Twins and Jack Haskell.
- Various artists (1992). Rodgers and Hart Revisited Vol. II. PSCD-139. Featuring Blossom Dearie, Gloria DeHaven, Dorothy Loudon, Bibi Osterwald, Charles Rydell and Bobby Short. Bonus material featuring Ann Hampton Callaway, Arthur Siegel, Sandy Stewart and Dennis and the New Deals.
- Various artists (1992). Rodgers and Hart Revisited Vol. V. PSCD-140. Featuring Ann Hampton Callaway, Mary Cleere Haran, Dorothy Loudon, Arthur Siegel, Sandy Stewart, Susan Stroman, Jan Neuberger, Dennis and the New Deals, and David Loud's Men.
- Various artists (1992). Alan Jay Lerner Revisited. PSCD-141. Featuring Blossom Dearie, Dorothy Loudon, Roddy MacDowall, Jerry Orbach, Nancy Walker, Ann Hampton Callaway, Robert Marks and Arthur Siegel.
- Various artists (1993). Vincent Youmans Revisited. PSCD-142. Featuring Cab Calloway, Blossom Dearie, Gloria DeHaven, Dorothy Loudon, Mary McCarty, Charles Rydell and Maureen Stapleton. Bonus material by Ann Hampton Callaway, Dorothy Loudon, Mary Cleere Haran and Arthur Siegel.
- Kaye Ballard (1993). The Ladies Who Wrote The Lyrics. PSCD-143.
- Various artists (1993). DeSylva, Brown And Henderson Revisited. PSCD-144. Featuring Cab Calloway, Blossom Dearie, Gloria DeHaven, Dorothy Loudon, Charles Rydell and Ken Parks. Bonus material featuring Ann Hampton Callaway, Sandy Stewart, Margaret Whiting, Marcus Neville, Tanya Moberly and Patti Wyss.
- Various artists (1993). DeSylva, Brown And Henderson Revisited Vol. II. PSCD-145. Featuring Ann Hampton Callaway, Mary Cleere Haran, Dorothy Loudon, Arthur Siegel, Sandy Stewart, Margaret Whiting, the Dennis Deal Singers and The Patios.
- Various artists (1993). Everyone Else Revisited. PSCD-146. Featuring Nell Carter, Arthur Siegel, Diane Carnevale, Dorothy Loudon, The Populaires, Patti Wyss and Su-La Haska.
- Various artists (1994). Vernon Duke Revisited Vol. III. PSCD-147. Featuring Kaye Ballard, Ann Hampton Callaway, Tammy Grimes, Mary Cleere Haran, Dorothy Loudon, Sula, Arthur Siegel and Sandy Stewart.
- Various artists (1994). Harold Arlen Revisited. PSCD-148. Featuring Nancy Andrews, David Burns, Blossom Dearie, Gloria DeHaven, Phyllis Diller, Estelle Parsons, and Charles Rydell. Bonus material featuring Ann Hampton Callaway, Arthur Siegel and Sandy Stewart.
- Symphony Orchestra conducted by Lehman Engel (1994). Ballet on Broadway. PSCD-149.
