= On the First Warm Day =

Single by Rosemary Clooney
- B-side: "Botch-a-Me (Ba-Ba-Baciami Piccina)"
- Released: 1952
- Recorded: April 18, 1952
- Genre: Traditional pop
- Length: 2:19
- Label: Columbia
- Songwriter(s): Bart Howard

Rosemary Clooney singles chronology
"Botch-a-Me (Ba-Ba-Baciami Piccina)" (1952)	"On the First Warm Day" (1952)	"Too Old to Cut the Mustard" (1952)

"On the First Warm Day"

Song by Rosemary Clooney

from the album "You're Just in Love (with Rosemary Clooney) THE EARLY HITS" [2003 compilation]
- Released: February 24, 2003
- Recorded: April 18, 1952
- Genre: Traditional pop
- Length: 2:19
- Label: Sepia
- Songwriter(s): Bart Howard

"On the First Warm Day" (also known as "The First Warm Day in May") is an American pop standard with music and lyrics by Bart Howard. It was originally recorded by Rosemary Clooney for Columbia Records on April 18, 1952. Other performers with renditions of the tune over the succeeding decades include Mabel Mercer (1952), Alma Cogan (1953), Portia Nelson (1956), Chris Connor (1958), Eydie Gormé (1958), Betty Johnson (1995), KT Sullivan (1997) and Joyce Breach (2003).

== Early recordings: Rosemary Clooney, Mabel Mercer and Alma Cogan ==
Rosemary Clooney's April 18 recording session, with harpsichordist Stan Freeman, bassist Frank Carroll, drummer Terry Snyder and guitarists Mundell Lowe and Sal Salvador, produced three songs, with the first, "Botch-a-Me (Ba-Ba-Baciami Piccina)" (catalog number 4–39767 CL 1230), turning out to be a major hit upon its release, which enhanced public acceptance of its flipside, "On the First Warm Day" (catalog number 4–39767 HL 7123). The third song was a duet with Marlene Dietrich, "Too Old to Cut the Mustard" (catalog number 4–39812 B 1699).

The first reviews and advertisements for the "Botch-a-Me"/"First Warm Day" 78 rpm (priced at 89 cents) appeared in newspapers at the end of June 1952 and continued into September, with some outlets discounting the discs to 19 cents by early August. Rosemary Clooney recorded "First Warm Day" one month before her 24th birthday.

At about the same time, the veteran performer from the previous generation for whom the song was written, 52-year-old Mabel Mercer (who first sang one of Bart Howard's compositions in 1938 and employed him as her piano accompanist during the late 1940s), recorded the song for issue on an Atlantic Records EP. It was also included on her first 10" Atlantic LP album, Songs by Mabel Mercer, Vol. 1 (1953), and subsequently reappeared on Atlantic's double 12" LP album, The Art of Mabel Mercer (1965), which collected all her 1953 EP and 10" LP recordings. It is currently available in the 6-CD set Only the Best of Mabel Mercer on the Collectables label.

In 1953, less than a year after its American debut, "First Warm Day" made its initial appearance in Britain, with 21-year-old Alma Cogan, England's most successful female pop singer of the 1950s, recording it as a duet alongside fellow pop vocalist Les Howard, whose solo rendition of another tune was on side B.

== Later renditions: Portia Nelson, Chris Connor and Eydie Gormé ==
Cabaret singer Portia Nelson, who was described as Bart Howard's muse of the 1950s, was 36 in 1956, when she recorded an entire album of his songs, Let Me Love You: Portia Nelson Sings the Songs of Bart Howard, with musical arrangements by Ralph Burns and liner notes by Liz Smith. Among the twelve songs comprising the album, "First Warm Day" was track 2.

In 1958, two of Rosemary Clooney's contemporaries, Chris Connor and Eydie Gormé, incorporated the tune into their respective albums. Chris Connor's cover version, like Mabel Mercer's five years earlier, was on the Atlantic label, and the April 8 recording session, which included Connor's renditions of two additional Bart Howard songs, "Be My All" and "One Love Affair" (both are also on Portia Nelson's album), featured one of the musicians from Rosemary Clooney's 1952 session, guitarist Mundell Lowe. The LP, Chris Craft (catalog number 1290/SD-1290), had a November release solely in monaural form, with a stereo version issued two years later, in 1960.

Eydie Gormé's LP, Love Is a Season, which has "First Warm Day" as track 4, was released by ABC-Paramount Records (catalog number Abcs-273) and, in her notes regarding the album, she reminisces that Bart Howard "was a great friend" whose "Fly Me to the Moon" she recorded under its original title, "In Other Words", for her other 1958 album, Eydie in Love. Upon being informed by her and the album's producer Don Costa that the theme of this album revolved around love being always in season, he returned within three days bringing "a wonderful song called Love Is a Season", which ultimately became the album's title tune.

== Into the CD era: Betty Johnson, KT Sullivan and Joyce Breach ==
Through the passing years, "First Warm Day" continued to be occasionally heard on radio and television, including the April 8, 1962 episode of The Jack Benny Program in which Irish tenor Dennis Day, a show regular, gave a rendition of the song. Decades later, in the CD era, Betty Johnson, a contemporary of Rosemary Clooney, Chris Connor and Eydie Gormé, who started as a child singer with her family in the 1930s, released, on her own label, Bliss Tavern Music, the album A Family Affair (the other singers on the album are her daughters Elisabeth Gray and Lydia Gray), with "First Warm Day" featured as track 8. The album, recorded at New York City's Nola Studios on September 10, 1993, was released on March 23, 1995 and featured Frank Tate on guitar, Tony Monte on piano and Bucky Pizzarelli on bass.

Among the next generation of singers, cabaret performers KT Sullivan and Joyce Breach made their own respective recordings of old standards. Described as "a close personal friend of Bart Howard", KT Sullivan made a decision to highlight "First Warm Day" as a medley with "My Love Is a Wanderer" on her album KT Sullivan - In Other Words: The Songs of Bart Howard (DRG Records catalog number DRGCD 91449), recorded October 13, 1996 and released July 15, 1997.

Pop/jazz performer Joyce Breach chose "First Warm Day" as the opening number in Joyce Breach: Remembering Mabel Mercer (Audiophile ACD-322, released April 8, 2003), the first of her three album tributes to the iconic singer who died in 1984 and, since Mabel Mercer was the first to popularize Bart Howard's compositions, this album and its successors also became, by extension, a small tribute to the songwriter. In addition to its star, the album's cover credits the Keith Ingham Trio (Keith Ingham: arrangements and piano, James Chirillo: guitar, Greg Cohen: bass). Writing liner notes for Remembering Mabel Mercer-Volume Three, John Gavin observes that "[I]n 1995, Joyce gave herself a life-changing fiftieth birthday present when she moved to Manhattan. The cabaret scene of her dreams was long past its heyday, but Joyce became a highly respected part of it..."

Eight months after Rosemary Clooney's death in June 2002, an Audio CD and MP3 album on the British Sepia label, You're Just in Love (with Rosemary Clooney) The Early Hits, a compilation of 25 songs she recorded in the early 1950s, featured "On the First Warm Day" as one of the selections.

Sixty years after its initial appearance, the song was rediscovered in May 2012 when the words in the opening lines indicating the month, "on the first warm day in May", were utilized in the service of one of department store J. C. Penney's series of television advertisements emphasizing seasonal apparel, with Rosemary Clooney's original recording becoming the soundtrack for a 30-second spot highlighting brief glimpses of warm-weather activities.

== See also ==
- Rosemary Clooney discography
- Alma Cogan discography
