= Bart Howard =

American songwriter and pianist

Bart Howard, circa 1990

Bart Howard (born Howard Joseph Gustafson; June 1, 1915 – February 21, 2004) was an American songwriter and pianist. He is best known for writing the jazz standard "Fly Me to the Moon".

== Biography ==
=== Early life and career ===
Bart Howard was born on June 1, 1915 in Burlington, Iowa. His parents were musical; both played piano, and his father played guitar and the mandolin. During Prohibition and the Depression, his father was also a bootlegger, which paid for young Howie's piano lessons.

At the age of 16 Howard left home to be the pianist for the dance band that toured with the conjoined twins Daisy and Violet Hilton. In Los Angeles, where he had gone hoping to write songs for the movies, he played for the female impersonator Ray Bourbon.

In 1937 Howard moved to New York City to accompany Elizabeth Talbot-Martin at the Rainbow Room. The colorful heiress Joe Carstairs took him under her wing. In 1938 Carstairs brought Mabel Mercer to New York for Mercer's first engagement there, and introduced Howard to Mercer on the day Mercer arrived. Carstairs' friend Marlene Dietrich encouraged Howard to offer Mercer his song "If You Leave Paris", which Mercer sang in her debut at the Ruban Bleu nightclub, the first time one of his songs was sung in New York.

Howard's New York career was interrupted by World War II, which he spent as a musician in the Army.

=== Performing and songwriting ===
After the war Howard worked at Spivy's Roof, until Mabel Mercer offered him twice the pay to accompany her at Tony's West Side. He played for her from 1946 through 1949, until Tony's closed. He then accompanied Portia Nelson at Celeste. In 1951 he became the M.C. and intermission pianist at The Blue Angel nightclub, where he remained for eight years, introducing performers including Dorothy Loudon and Eartha Kitt. In 1956, during young Johnny Mathis's engagement at the Blue Angel, Howard mentored him, and fed him at Howard's apartment since racism excluded Mathis from most restaurants.

Howard met Thomas "Bud" Fowler in the early 1950s, and wrote "Let Me Love You" and "My Love Is a Wanderer" for him on the same day. After some wandering, they remained together for the rest of Howard's life.

Howard was also active in the revues which were part of 1950s New York's cabaret scene. He contributed "Let Me Love You", "Take Care of Yourself" and "This Is the Day" to 1952's Curtain Going Up, which despite its title closed in Philadelphia. "My Love Is a Wanderer" was in John Murray Anderson's Almanac in 1953, though it was cut after opening. Howard's "Perfect Stranger" and "Upstairs at the Downstairs Waltz" were performed in Take Five (1957), "Everybody Wants to Be Loved" in Pieces of Eight (1959) and "Thanks to You (I'm a Brand New Woman)" in Dressed to the Nines (1960), all presented by Julius Monk at Upstairs at the Downstairs. In 1961 "So Long As He Loves You" was in Fourth Avenue North at the Madison Avenue Playhouse. Howard never reached Broadway: a musical with Sam and Bella Spewack about the life of Gertrude Lawrence, for which Howard wrote songs including "Beware of the Woman" and "Who Besides You", was never completed.

Howard's first commercial recognition came when Rosemary Clooney recorded "On the First Warm Day" for the first time, in 1952, and the second when Lena Horne recorded "Let Me Love You" on It's Love in 1955. A bigger breakthrough was when Mathis included "Let Me Love You" and "Year After Year" on his second album, Wonderful, Wonderful, in 1957. But much greater success was still to come.

In 1954 Felicia Sanders debuted Howard's song "In Other Words" at the Blue Angel. Kaye Ballard recorded it for the first time that year. Peggy Lee recorded it in 1960, then gave it wide exposure on The Ed Sullivan Show on October 16th of that year. The song gradually became better known by its first line, as "Fly Me to the Moon", and Lee convinced Howard to officially change the song's title. In 1962 and 1963 Joe Harnell's bossa nova instrumental version of the song became a big hit and won a Grammy. In 1963 and 1964 Count Basie and Frank Sinatra performed versions of the song rearranged by Quincy Jones from Howard's 3/4 waltz time into the now-familiar 4/4 swing time. Income from the song supported Howard comfortably for the rest of his life.

Howard wrote more than 60 songs. Mercer, Nelson and Mathis (who called him "my Cole Porter") were the performers that most often recorded them. In 1959 Howard added lyrics to Neal Hefti's "Li'l Darlin'" to create "Don't Dream of Anybody But Me". He wrote English lyrics for two Italian songs, Carlo Alberto Rossi and Vito Pallavicini's hit "Le mille bolle blu", in English "A Thousand Blue Bubbles", and Armando Trovajoli and Dino Verde's "Lady Luna", both in 1961. At Frank Sinatra's request, Howard wrote "The Man in the Looking Glass" for Sinatra's 1965 album September of My Years.

=== Later life ===
In 1959 Howard was earning enough money from recordings of his songs to no longer need to work as an M.C. When, on stage at the Blue Angel, he heard an audience member exclaim "My God, is he still here?", he thought "That's it! I'm quitting!", and did. He said, "[...] we could no longer book the right acts anymore because they were all on television". "The clubs closed, the music changed, and so did I".

Howard left New York City in 1971. He lived in North Salem, New York, and had homes in Palm Beach, Florida, and France.

When Howard met his idol, Cole Porter, shortly after arriving in New York City, Porter had advised Howard to learn to sing his own songs. Howard finally began singing, to his own accompaniment, in the late 1980s, in a benefit concert series in North Salem and a cabaret show in Manhattan and on a 1990 album.

Howard died February 21, 2004, at age 88, in Carmel, New York. He was survived by his partner of 58 years, Thomas "Bud" Fowler, and a sister, Dorothy Lind of Burlington. Howard and, later, Fowler were buried in northern Texas.

== Musical style ==
With few exceptions, Bart Howard wrote both the music and the lyrics of his songs. They reflected the performers they were written for and the places they were sung: "[His] songs were made to be sung in small places [...] They defined the word 'intimate'." They were written for "people who wanted to listen"; they had "beautiful melodies and sensitive, memorable lyrics". KT Sullivan, Howard's latter-day champion, observed that they worked especially well for sopranos; his longtime collaborators Mabel Mercer and Portia Nelson were both sopranos, as is Sullivan. He wrote more lyrics specifically for a woman (such as "It Was Worth It", "So Long As He Loves You", "Who Besides You" and "Would You Believe It") than most songwriters, who tend to write songs that can be sung by either gender.

Howard's songwriting idol was Cole Porter, and the sophistication of his songs brought comparisons to Porter's, but Howard's songs were not as musically or verbally complex as Porter's. The singer Anita Ellis said, "I like Bart's songs better than [Stephen Sondheim's ...] Steve's are much harder. Bart's can become part of you. He leaves room for that to happen."

Excluding his one attempt at a musical, Howard wrote only standalone songs that could be about anything he wanted, none that had to serve a theatrical plot, and almost always about love. (Note: Howard did write three songs on the subject of age: "It Was Worth It" for Mabel Mercer's 50th birthday, "The Man in the Looking Glass" for Frank Sinatra's, and "Young Just Once" for himself in his seventies.) "Few other songwriters glorified romance or mourned its failure as passionately as Howard ... Almost every song he wrote is a lovers' vignette." Howard himself wrote: "My songs are about love [...] I always approach the writing of lyrics with a kind of smiling compassion for the poor creatures who keep trying to cope with this dear devil emotion. And, since words alone cannot tell the tale, I aim for melodies and harmonies that betray the anxieties behind the casual lyric observation." But Howard also knew how to hold his listeners' attention: many of his songs (such as "Let Me Love You", "Walk-Up" and "You Are Not My First Love") end with surprises, whether disconcerting or pleasant.

== Awards and honors ==
"Fly Me to the Moon", whose melody had already won a Grammy, was named a Towering Song by the Songwriters Hall of Fame in 1999. Bart Howard was inducted into the Cabaret Hall of Fame in 2015.

The ASCAP Foundation Bart Howard Songwriting Scholarship was established in 2011 to recognize Berklee College of Music students majoring in songwriting. The Bart Howard Foundation awards scholarships to musically inclined Burlington-area students. Howard and Fowler funded the creation of the Bart Howard Lounge, a 55-seat performance space modeled after the Blue Angel, on the lower level of the Des Moines County Heritage Museum.

== Songs ==
- "Alone With Me" (1955)
- "Anatomy of a Love Song" †
- "Baby, Go Away Now" †
- "Be My All (Or Be My Nothing)" (1958)
- "Beaucoup D'Amour"
- "(I Feel) Beautiful Inside"
- "Beautiful Women" (1956)
- "Beware of the Woman" † ††
- "Don't Dream of Anybody But Me" (1959, c. Neal Hefti)
- "Everybody Wants to Be Loved" (1959, from Pieces of Eight)
- "Ev'rybody's Lookin' (Around for an Angel)" (1961)
- "Fantastic!" (1960)
- "Fly Me to the Moon (In Other Words)" (1954)
- "Forget Me Not"
- "Gather Your Dreams"
- "I Want [to?] Go with You"
- "If You Leave Paris" (l. Ian Grant)
- "I'll Be Easy to Find" (1958)
- "Imagining Things" (1965)
- "It Was Worth It! (That's What I'll Say)" (1956)
- "I've Got Everything" (1960) †
- "The Joy of Loving You"
- "Lady Luna" (1961, c. Armando Trovajoli)
- "Let Me Love You" (1955)
- "Love Is a Season" (1959)
- "Lovely" (l. Howard Dietz)
- "The Man in the Looking Glass" (1965)
- "Miracles" (1960)
- "Music for Lovers"
- "My Love Is a Wanderer" (1952)
- "Never Kiss"
- "New Fangled Moon"
- "Nobody Knows How Much I Love You"
- "On the First Warm Day" (1952)
- "One Look at You"
- "One Love Affair"
- "Overture to the Blues" (1961)
- "Paralyzed"
- "Perfect Stranger" (1956, from Take Five)
- "Please Be True"
- "Sell Me!" (1957)
- "Silence" (1938, with Howard Rhines)
- "Skyful of Rainbows"
- "So Long As He Loves You" (1961)
- "Take Care of Yourself"
- "Thank You for the Lovely Summer" (1952)
- "Thanks to You (I'm a Brand New Woman)" (1960, from Dressed to the Nines)
- "A Thousand Blue Bubbles" (1961, c. Carlo Alberto Rossi)
- "To Be in Love! (A Fantastic Love Song)" (1957)
- "The Tomorrow Song"
- "Upstairs at the Downstairs Waltz" (1957, from Take Five)
- "A Walk in the Country" (1956)
- "Walk-Up" (1956)
- "Welcome Home, Angelina" (1964)
- "What Do I Hear"
- "What Do You Feel in Your Heart"
- "When Somebody Cares" †
- "Where Do You Think You're Going?" (1959)
- "Who Besides You" † ††
- "Who Wants to Fall in Love (Aye, Aye, Aye)" (1953)
- "With Feeling" (with Marvin Fisher)
- "Would You Believe It?" (1952)
- "Year After Year" (1955)
- "Young Just Once" (1988)
- "You Are in Love"
- "You Are Not My First Love" (1953)

† Copyrighted long after Howard's retirement, and likely written earlier.
†† Written for Howard's uncompleted musical about Gertrude Lawrence.

== Discography ==
- Portia Nelson (1956, re-released 1995). Let Me Love You: Songs of Bart Howard (CD). New York: DRG Records 91442.
- Bart Howard, K.T. Sullivan, Julie Wilson and William Roy (undated, c. 1990). Bart! The Songs of Bart Howard (CD). Jackson Heights, NY: Painted Smiles Records PSCD-114.
- KT Sullivan (1997). In Other Words: The Songs of Bart Howard (CD). New York: DRG Records 91449.
