= Bruz Fletcher =

Performer and author

- Born: Stoughton J. Fletcher III; March 12, 1906; Indianapolis, Indiana
- Died: February 8, 1941 (aged 34) Tarzana, California
- Genres: Lounge, cabaret
- Occupations: Songwriter, pianist, singer, novelist, playwright
- Years active: ca. 1926–1941
- Label: Liberty Music Shop Records
- Website: Bruz Fletcher biographical site

Stoughton J. "Bruz" Fletcher III (March 12, 1906 – February 8, 1941) was a gay musician and literary figure who came to prominence in Los Angeles during the 1930s. He played piano, and wrote, sang and recorded risqué songs about sex, gay culture, prostitutes, adulterers, intersex people, alcoholics, hedonists, outsiders, predators, and grifters. He ended his own life at age 34.

Fletcher by 1929 had become a songwriter; for 1929 and 1930 he toured the United States as an accompanying pianist and songwriter for a vaudeville performance headlined by Esther Ralston. In 1932, Fletcher wrote multiple novels and plays. Fletcher then began performing in clubs and cafes: in New York in 1934, in Palm Beach, Florida from January 1935, and in Sunset Boulevard, Los Angeles from August 1935. He made many singing performances at the Bali nightclub in Sunset Boulevard from 1936 to 1940, entertaining numerous celebrities. However, he expressed that his true passion was songwriting, and that he would prefer to earn money being a playwright or a novelist than a singer. In 1938, his Laurel Canyon, Los Angeles home and belongings were destroyed in a fire. In 1939, he was found guilty of drunk driving after injuring two others in a vehicular accident, and banned from drinking alcohol for three years. In 1941, he died by suicide, possibly due to failing to find employment.

== Family upbringing ==
Fletcher was born into a wealthy Indiana banking family that owned what came to be consolidated as the Fletcher American National Bank, one of the most successful commercial banks in the state. Fletcher's grandfather, Stoughton Fletcher I, owned the Delco-Remy Company, which had pioneered automobile self-starters. His grandfather's many successful commercial interests, which also included two Indianapolis banks and a large engine works, had allowed him to build a $2,000,000 home. However, Fletcher's ambitious father, Stoughton Fletcher II, squandered the multi-generational family fortune on unsuccessful investments and lost the family estate. After the Wall Street crash of 1929, the family's financial interests were wiped out. The father was reduced to working as an elevator operator.

Fletcher grew up in Laurel Hall, a mansion in northeast Indianapolis. The Fletcher family had become notorious for unconventional behavior, high society escapades and premature deaths. They owned a private yacht with which they traveled the world. The novelist Booth Tarkington, who was briefly married to Fletcher's aunt, Laurel Louisa Fletcher, reportedly used the troubled Fletcher family as the inspiration for his 1918 novel The Magnificent Ambersons.

Fletcher's nickname was a diminutive of "brother". He attended several prestigious boarding schools, including the Brooks School for Boys (now Park Tudor School) and the Hill School, as well as the Howe Military Academy. He also attended the University of Virginia. In 1921, his mother killed herself by drinking prussic acid; about an hour later, his grandmother, distraught over her daughter's death, took her own life in the same way.

== Career ==
In 1926 Fletcher moved to Hollywood. For a few years he eked out a living by composing songs for early Talkies, including "Dream Girl" and "Cocaine". Around this time he became involved and began living with his long-term life partner, Casey Roberts. Fletcher and Roberts (a three-time Academy Award nominee) lived together as an openly gay couple for years, often hosting salons. They collaborated on artistic endeavors, including theatrical productions, literary endeavors, and various fine art projects.

By 1929, Fletcher had written songs for actresses Leatrice Joy and Ruth Roland to perform, while author A. M. Williamson said that Fletcher had written a musical score for her book Bill the Sheik. In 1929 and 1930, he performed as a pianist in vaudeville with actress Esther Ralston, who sang songs he had crafted for her. They travelled around performing at theatres owned by RKO. They performed at the Orpheum in Los Angeles, at the Keith-Albee Theatre in Boston, at Proctor's Theatre in Yonkers, New York, at the Hennepin-Orpheum at Minneapolis, at the New Orpheum Theatre in Sioux City, Iowa, at the Orpheum in Omaha, Nebraska, at the RKO Mainstreet in Kansas City, Missouri, at the Earle Theater in Washington D.C., at the Fisher Theatre in Detroit, at Shea's Buffalo in Buffalo, New York, as well as other venues in Brooklyn, in Rochester, New York, in Mount Vernon, New York, in Paterson, New Jersey, in Cincinnati, in St Louis, in South Bend, Indiana, and in Philadelphia.

Fletcher's first novel Beginning with Laughter (being sold at $2) was published in January 1932. The plot was about an orphan, who would become a nightclub hostess in debauchery-laden New York, as well as her lover, a songwriter, and their patron, a rich owner of nightclubs. By May 1932, another novel of Fletcher's, entitled Only the Rich, was published (also being sold at $2), regarding an heiress who flees an arranged marriage and finds new romance. By August 1932, he was said to have written a Broadway play, Aggie's Affairs. As a chronicler of the demimonde, during his career, Bruz spiced his literary works with details that provided candid glimpses into a world populated by society dowagers, misfits, celebs, addicts, servants, lovers, and eccentrics who reflected a wide variety of sexual orientations and behavior.

Fletcher in December 1932 was writing sketches for Queenie Smith to perform in New York. The play Not a Saint, written by Fletcher and John Montague, starring Queenie Smith and George Walcott, was performed from June 1933, about a salacious actress who ultimately fails to woo a man and dies from a drug overdose; Fletcher and Montague had to deny allegations that the play was based on the life of Jeanne Eagels. In February 1934, Fletcher began performing at the Casino Town Club in New York together with Smith, with Fletcher singing while playing the piano.

Fletcher and Casey Roberts in March 1934, held an exhibition in New York for their photographs, including those of Serge Obolensky, the wife of Vincent Astor, and Casey's cook. In December 1934, Fletcher and Roberts travelled to Palm Beach, Florida, after having released another novel, October Again, and crafted the lyrics of the Frimi musical and comedic performance for Christmas in New York. In January 1935, Fletcher started a daily singing routine during cocktail hour in the Sidewalk Cafe at The Patio in Palm Peach. In February 1935, Fletcher contributed the lyrical composition of a musical number for the Bal de Tete dance event in Palm Beach's Everglades Club. During these months, he was noted to have mixed around with Maurice Fatio and Hugh Dillman. In March 1935, Fletcher and Casey Roberts exhibited more of their art in Palm Beach, including Fletcher's watercolor drawings and photos.

Fletcher returned to New York in April 1935, to edit his play, Velvet Lined, after it was bought for performance at Broadway. In July 1935, Fletcher was made by Ted Healy to perform in front of Joan Crawford and other cast and crew in the midst of a film production in Hollywood, Los Angeles. Later that year, Fletcher performed at Sunset Boulevard, first at the Three Stars nightclub by August, where he was once arrested for being complicit in selling alcohol after permitted hours (which he denied), and then at Cafe LaMaze. During that time, Fletcher's performance of "I Live in the House Where Garbo Used to Live", regarding Greta Garbo, was noted to have offended a producer working at Garbo's studio despite the song's innocuous lyrics, such that the cafe he was performing at forbade Fletcher from performing that song there henceforth.

Fletcher had moved to Laurel Canyon, Los Angeles by 1936; he counted among his friends Queenie Smith, Ted Healy, Nancy Carroll, Jane Darwell, Grace Hayes, Maude Eburne and Helen Ainsworth. In June 1936, his comedic play Commuting Distance was shown in the Beechwood Theatre of Scarborough-on-Hudson in New York. By the next year, Fletcher had developed the hobby of growing herbs, including catnip for his pet cats, with local media reported that he may have "the only complete herb garden on the Pacific Coast".

In the late 1930s, Fletcher became renowned as a nightclub entertainer, during what came to be known as "The Pansy Craze". He performed in glamorous venues, delighting his sophisticated patrons with witty and risqué songs punctuated with salacious patter, clearly influenced by Noël Coward and Cole Porter. Fletcher wrote at least six plays, many for summer stock, including The Greater Thing (1930). Fletcher was known as "The Singing Satirist". His four-year-plus run in Club Bali in the second half of the 1930s, underscored a bawdy, party-like atmosphere for the city's most outrageous celebrities and notables. "It was on the Sunset Strip that a tiki lounge called Club Bali opened its doors," wrote historian Jenny Hamel. "Waiters wearing sarongs would serve drinks and 'curried dishes' to all the patrons sitting on red couches. And the headlining act for five years was an openly gay, high society piano and song man by the name of Bruz Fletcher." "Hollywood’s artistic crowd would fill the Bali night after night," During his run at the Bali, Fletcher's name received about two hundred mentions in the Los Angeles Times. Some show business legends who caught Fletcher's act were dismissive. "After a movie tonight I stopped at Bali to have a look at Bruz Fletcher, a cousin of Elizabeth's, the son of the rich, rich cousin (Stoughton Fletcher) who ruled Indianapolis," wrote producer/screenwriter Charles Brackett. "This poor little guy ... survives by singing songs at the tawdriest of pansy night clubs. He's a wisp of a creature, too touching to think about."

By July 1936, Fletcher was reported to be performing at the Bali nightclub in Sunset Boulevard, Los Angeles (Fletcher himself claims he started at Bali in July 1935). Fletcher in February 1937 was robbed of $18 while in the Bali, as witnessed by Elaine Barrie, and three men were later arrested over the incident. Local media reported in March 1937 that Fletcher "is the chief attraction at the Club Bali". Fletcher was noted to choose his dinner jacket color to match guests he was entertaining. Given his performances, he was allowed to write a guest column for the Los Angeles Evening Citizen News, which he did so in the form of a poem. Also that year, Fletcher allowed Lee Wiley to perform some of his songs for a fee. He told the media that his childhood and enduring ambition was songwriting, and other than that he had "no ambition at all", but that he had to sing to earn money to survive, even though "I really hate to sing", and would also prefer to be employed as a playwright or a novelist. After visiting Mexico for six weeks in late 1937, Fletcher experienced stage fright upon returning to entertain in Bali.

Among those Fletcher entertained at the Bali in 1937 included Peggy Fears, Patsy Kelly, Bradford Ropes, Jack Kirkland, Phyllis Brooks, James Ellison, June Travis, Dick Purcell, Dave Rubinoff, Gypsy Rose Lee, McClelland Barclay, Addison Randall, Louise Brooks, Thyra Samter Winslow, Henry Wadsworth, Alice White, Frank Morgan, Jimmy Durante, Jack Haley, Paula Stone, Charles K. Feldman, Fred Perry, Helen Vinson, Regis Toomey, Alan Campbell, Dorothy Parker, John Warburton, Polly Ann Young, Rowland V. Lee, Maurice Murphy, Dixie Dunbar, Gloria Holden, Robert Benchley, Chester Morris, Alice Brady, Virginia Faulkner, Philip MacDonald, and Edward Stevenson.

When Fletcher went to a drugstore to purchase cigarettes, his $20,000 Laurel Canyon house was entirely burnt down in June 1938, destroying all his possessions and killing his two cats, his dog and his monkey; it was unknown how the fire started. Fletcher, who had not yet fully paid for the cost of his furniture, cameras and piano, had to continue paying the remaining installments despite these possessions being destroyed in the fire. In light of the losses, Alice Brady and Jean Acker helped to raise funds and collect items for Fletcher and Casey Roberts. By August 1938, Fletcher had constructed a new home in the Valley (later reported to be in Tarzana, Los Angeles); this time he purchased insurance for his home. In November 1938, Fletcher suffered bruises after he accidentally rammed his car into a tree after trying to avoid a dog. In December 1938, Fletcher's garage was destroyed in a fire.

In 1938, as part of "the longest run anyone has had in a night club" in Los Angeles according to the Los Angeles Times, Fletcher entertained at Bali. Among those entertained were Ronald Reagan, Anita Louise, Humphrey Bogart, Mayo Methot, Howard Hughes, Mary Maguire, Patricia Ellis, Travis Banton, Bonita Granville, Virginia Field, Peter Lind Hayes, Frances Robinson, Louise Stanley, Howard Shoup, Lila Lee, Ona Munson, Clara Kimball Young, Ralph Forbes, Heather Angel, Lew Pollack, and Margaret Hamilton. For some months in mid-1938 Fletcher appeared on KMTR evening radio. By 1938 he had forged connections with three of Charlie Chaplin's wives, but not Chaplin himself, as Fletcher had performed in vaudeville with Mildred Harris, written songs for Lita Grey, and entertained Paulette Goddard. Fletcher's performances led him to be described by the Los Angeles Times as the "Dwight Fiske of the Coast, except that he writes sentimental chansons as well as cynical fables".

In 1939, Fletcher entertained at Bali: Gladys George, Leonard Penn, Gertrude Michael, and Maxie Rosenbloom. Also, Fletcher's pet weeper monkey Patsy escaped from Fletcher's Encino, Los Angeles ranch for two weeks, biting two people who tried to catch it, before in January 1939 Patsy was apprehended. Patsy and another weeper monkey, Peter, both escaped from Fletcher's ranch in October 1939 when Fletcher travelled to San Francisco, with Patsy returning to the ranch, but Peter disappearing. In June 1939, Fletcher was driving when his car hit another car, injuring two people in the other car, resulting in Fletcher's arrest for potentially driving while drunk. A trial was held in October 1939 for Fletcher, to decide if he was guilty of a felony, with the arresting officer testifying that Fletcher was drunk, with alcohol in Fletcher's car. Fletcher denied that he was drunk or driving into traffic at the time of the incident. This trial resulted in a hung jury, with 10 in favor of acquitting Fletcher and 2 against. Another trial was arranged, and the second jury in December 1939 found Fletcher guilty of drink driving. That month Superior Court Judge Georgia Bullock sentenced Fletcher to three years probation on the condition that he abstain from alcohol during this period.

In mid-December 1939, Fletcher announced he would leave his entertainer job at the Bali nightclub in January 1940. However, he did later make some appearances to entertain at Bali in August and September 1940. By mid-1940, Fletcher had written a play entitled Ah, Lovely Day for Leonard Penn to produce. In October 1940, Fletcher began performing at New York's Brevoort Supper Club, before moving to perform in New York's Ruban Bleu in November 1940. By the end of 1940, Fletcher had composed a song for Penn's wife Gladys George to perform at the British War Relief Ball.

Over the course of his career, Fletcher recorded more than two dozen songs on 78 rpm records, many issued by Liberty Music Shop Records. His songs, laced with double-entendres and social satire, included "The Hellish Mrs. Haskell", "Nympho-Dipso-Ego Maniac", "Get It Up, Kitty", and "Lei from Hawaii". His best-known song, "Drunk With Love", was recorded in 1946 by Frances Faye, who re-recorded it two more times during the 1950s. "It ['Drunk with Love'] was the number one song that you would hear in gay, especially lesbian bars of the 1940s and '50s," said Fletcher biographer Tyler Alpern. "You can’t look at any literature or interviews or oral histories from that time without somebody mentioning 'Drunk with Love'." "Some of Fletcher's songs sound tailored to carry one set of meanings to heterosexuals and another to gay men, much like Cole Porter's," wrote historian Stuart Timmons. "The fact that Fletcher employed a speedy and sometimes blunt wit strikingly similar to that of Rae Bourbon is telling. Noel and Cole, for all their outrageousness, were careful not to cross certain lines or close certain doors. Bruz Fletcher was clearly more daring—more confident, more careless, or a volatile mix of both."

== Death ==
Fletcher died by suicide, via carbon monoxide poisoning, in the early morning of February 8, 1941. Fletcher had attended a party in Jack Sowden's home in Tarzana, Los Angeles, where alcohol was served, during which Sowden found Fletcher unresponsive in an exhaust-filled car in Sowden's closed garage, with the engine running due to the accelerator being kept engaged by a handkerchief; thinking that Fletcher was drunk, Sowden put Fletcher to bed, only for Sowden to discover in the morning that Fletcher was dead; according to Sowden, Fletcher could not find employment and thus expressed intent to kill himself. Of note, weeks prior, he had returned to Los Angeles and found that the nightclub that previously employed him had shut down. Fletcher's body was cremated on February 11, under order by his father, who declined to hold a funeral. However, Patsy Kelly later contributed money to host a funeral for Fletcher.

A month after Fletcher's death, The Kansas City Star reported that Fletcher's death came after he failed to secure employment in New York, then was ferried home to Los Angeles where former friends rejected him, leaving him unable to meaningfully repay the driver for the ride. Later that month, people spent money to obtain recordings of Fletcher's nightclub performances.
