= Jo Sullivan Loesser =

American actress and singer (1927–2019)

Jo Sullivan
- Born: Elizabeth Josephine Sullivan; August 28, 1927; Mounds, Illinois, U.S.
- Died: April 28, 2019 (aged 91); Manhattan, New York City, U.S.
- Other name: Jo Sullivan Loesser
- Occupations: Actress, singer
- Spouse(s): Don Jacobs (m. 1952— div. 1958) Frank Loesser (m. 1959; died 1969) Jack Osborn (m. 1973– div. ?)
- Partner(s): Jacquin Fink (c. 1983 — 2019)
- Children: 2

Elizabeth Josephine Sullivan Loesser (née Sullivan; August 28, 1927 – April 28, 2019) was an American actress and high lyric soprano singer. She became a musical theatre star with her performance in the original production of The Most Happy Fella, for which she was nominated for a Tony Award in 1957.

== Early years ==
She was the daughter of Hessie Boone Sullivan and Eileen Celeste Woods Sullivan, who worked for a lumber-distributing company and sold cosmetics, respectively. She was born in Mounds, Illinois, on August 28, 1927, and attended Cleveland High School. After studying singing in St. Louis, in the late 1940s, she studied music at Columbia University after failing to be accepted at Juilliard School and working at Lord & Taylor department store in New York to support herself. She competed on the Arthur Godfrey's Talent Scouts radio program but lost to a pair of harmonica players.

== Career ==
Sullivan played Polly Peachum in Marc Blitzstein's English-language adaptation of The Threepenny Opera by Kurt Weill and Bertolt Brecht off-Broadway in 1954. She also appeared as herself in an "original special" on Broadway, called Let's Make An Opera (1950), which boasted music by Benjamin Britten, a libretto by Eric Crozier, musical direction by Norman Del Mar, and was directed by Marc Blitzstein.

In the summer of 1951, she played Dorothy Gale in The Muny's production of The Wizard of Oz, opposite Margaret Hamilton, who reprised her film role of the Wicked Witch of the West. In 1992, Loesser's daughter, Emily, played the same role at The Muny, marking the first time in The Muny's history that a role has been played by both mother and daughter. Loesser later reprised her role in the 1953 production at the Kansas City Starlight Theatre.

She married Frank Loesser on April 29, 1959, just ahead of the May 1, 1959, deadline that Sullivan had given Loesser to marry her "or she would carry on with her career and forget about him." They had two children, Hannah (1962–2007) and Emily (born 1965), who is also a singer-actress.

She also appeared on numerous recordings, such as Loesser by Loesser (alongside her daughter, Emily) as well as several albums for Ben Bagley's "Revisited" series on Painted Smiles Records (most notably Kurt Weill Revisited, Leonard Bernstein Revisited, and Frank Loesser Revisited).

In the early 1980s, she resumed her performing career when officials of The Ballroom, a nightclub in New York City, asked her to sing some of her late husband's songs. After that, she performed at other night clubs and in several theatrical musicals. In 1984, Loesser developed a revue, Jo Sullivan Sings Frank Loesser and Friends, that was presented in several cities.

From the time of her husband's death in 1969 until her own death in 2019, she managed his estate, particularly Frank Music Company, which included guiding production of all of his musicals, including Guys and Dolls, How to Succeed in Business Without Really Trying and The Most Happy Fella. The publishing portion of the company was sold to CBS Records in 1976.

== Personal life ==
Around 1952, Sullivan married Don Jacobs. They were divorced in 1958.

In 1973, Loesser married Jack Osborn, who headed an industrial design firm.

In 1983, she began a relationship with stockbroker Jacquin Fink. The two remained partners until Sullivan's death in 2019.

Mrs. Loesser is survived by a daughter from that marriage, Emily Stephenson, an actress and singer with whom she performed into the 1990s; two stepchildren, Susan Loesser and John Loesser; four grandchildren; and her longtime companion, Jacquin Fink. Another daughter, Hannah, an artist, died of cancer in 2007.

== Death ==
Loesser died of heart failure on April 28, 2019, at her home in New York City. She was 91.

== Theatre credits ==
- Sleepy Hollow (June 3, 1948 – June 12, 1948)
- As the Girls Go (November 13, 1948 – January 14, 1950)
- Let's Make an Opera (December 13, 1950 – December 16, 1950)
- Wizard of Oz (Summer of 1951 at The Municipal Opera Association of St. Louis)
- Wizard of Oz (Summer of 1953 at the Kansas City Starlight Theatre)
- To Hell With Orpheus (August 18 – August 23, 1953) at the Lambertville, New Jersey Music Circus
- The Threepenny Opera (March 10, 1954 – May 30, 1954)
- Carousel (June 2, 1954 - August 8, 1954, New York City Center Light Opera Company)
- The Threepenny Opera (September 30, 1955 – December 17, 1961)
- The Most Happy Fella (May 3, 1956 – December 14, 1957)
- Guys & Dolls (E.J. Thomas Performing Arts Hall ~ summer stock 1974)
- Perfectly Frank (November 30, 1980 – December 13, 1980)
- The Most Happy Fella (February 13, 1992 - August 30, 1992)
