= John Reardon (baritone) =

American opera singer (1930–1988)

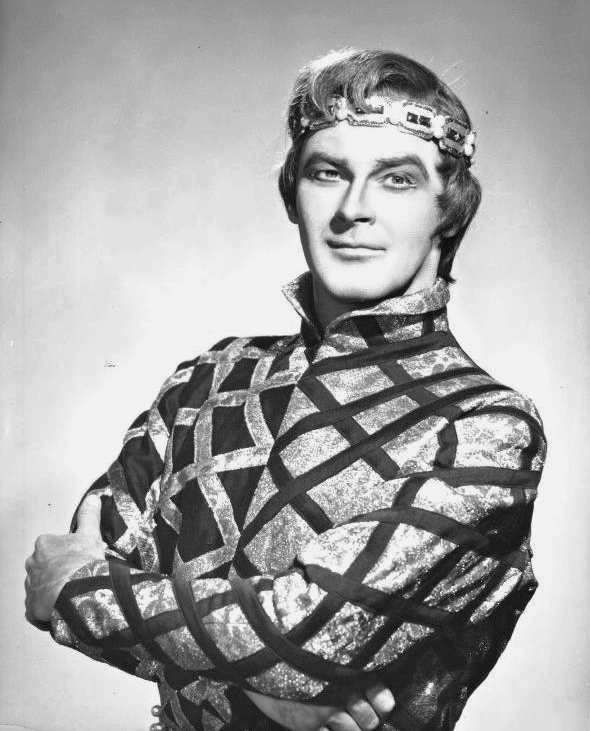
Reardon in Romeo and Juliet at the Metropolitan Opera in 1976

John Reardon (April 8, 1930 – April 16, 1988) was an American baritone and actor who was noted for his performances on television, including many appearances on the PBS children's television show Mister Rogers' Neighborhood.

Making his debut with the New York City Opera in 1954, he sang 33 roles with them until 1972, returning in 1983 for performances as Danilo in The Merry Widow. He portrayed Yehohada in the world premiere of Hugo Weisgall's opera Athaliah on February 17, 1964 at Philharmonic Hall, New York.

Reardon was a member of the New York Metropolitan Opera from 1965 until 1977, appearing in such operas as Carmen and Jenufa. In 1967, Reardon created the role of Orin Mannon (the equivalent of Orestes in Aeschylus' Oresteia) in the world premiere of Marvin David Levy's Mourning Becomes Electra. His last performance at the Met was as Papageno in The Magic Flute on April 6, 1977.

He co-starred with Phil Silvers on Broadway in the Jule Styne musical Do Re Mi, introducing the standard song "Make Someone Happy". He also appeared on Broadway in New Faces of 1956 and Gian Carlo Menotti's The Saint of Bleecker Street. He performed the role of Schaunard in the famous 1956 recording of La Boheme conducted by Sir Thomas Beecham. In 1960 he created the main role of Mr. McC in a nine-minute opera Introductions and Good-Byes by Lukas Foss, premiered on May 5, 1960, in New York City with New York Philharmonic conducted by Leonard Bernstein. In 1969 he created the role of Dr. Stone in the premiere of Menotti's Help, Help, the Globolinks! at the Santa Fe Opera.

Reardon was chosen by Igor Stravinsky to sing the role of Nick Shadow on the composer's second recording of his opera The Rake's Progress. Reardon also appears on several of Ben Bagley's Painted Smiles Records Revisited albums.

Reardon died of AIDS-related pneumonia in 1988, at his home in Santa Fe, New Mexico at age 58.
