= Robert Marks (vocal coach) =

Bob Marks
- Vocal coach Bob Marks

Background information
- Born: Robert Sonnenmark; Kew Gardens, New York
- Occupations: Vocal coach, music director, conductor, author
- Years active: 1974–present
- Website: bobmarks.com

Robert "Bob" Marks is an American vocal coach, music arranger, accompanist, conductor, and music director in New York City. His students have included Natalie Portman, Britney Spears, Ariana Grande, Lea Michele, Laura Bell Bundy, Kerry Butler, Nikki M. James, Constantine Maroulis, Sarah Jessica Parker, Debbie Gibson, and Ashley Tisdale. ] He is the co-author (with Dr. Elizabeth Gerbi) of "Bob Marks' 88 Keys to Successful Singing Performances: Audition Advice From One of America's Top Vocal Coaches," which was published by Thomas Noble Books in 2020.

== Personal life ==
Marks was born in Kew Gardens, NY to Peter and Eve Sonnenmark. Marks is Jewish and both his parents were Holocaust survivors. His father Peter grew up in Prostějov, Czechoslovakia. Marks's paternal grandparents and aunt were killed in Auschwitz, but his father was able to escape to Palestine (which later became Israel) with the help of an uncle, Francis Huber. Marks's father immigrated to the United States in his early 20s, and died in 2010. Marks's mother, Eve, escaped Austria with her parents during the Holocaust and immigrated to the United States in 1938, when she was 11 years old. She died in 1973.

Marks began studying music at age five. He became involved with theater at age 14 when he acted as the musical director for a community theater production of Damn Yankees. He holds a degree in speech and voice pathology from Montclair State College (now Montclair State University).

He has one sister, Lauren, and since 1981 he has been married to Elayne Marks. They have two daughters, Erica and Arielle, and six grandchildren.

== Career ==
Marks opened a studio in New York City in 1977, shortly after being hired as a pianist for the original Broadway production of the musical Annie. At the time, many vocal coaches believed that young performers should not study voice, so Marks began teaching with a focus on training young singers and actors. He is now considered a leading vocal coach for performers of all ages and has been featured in articles from Read Periodicals and The Daily Beast. Additionally, he is a regular guest blogger on BroadwayWorld, where he writes a column about vocal training.

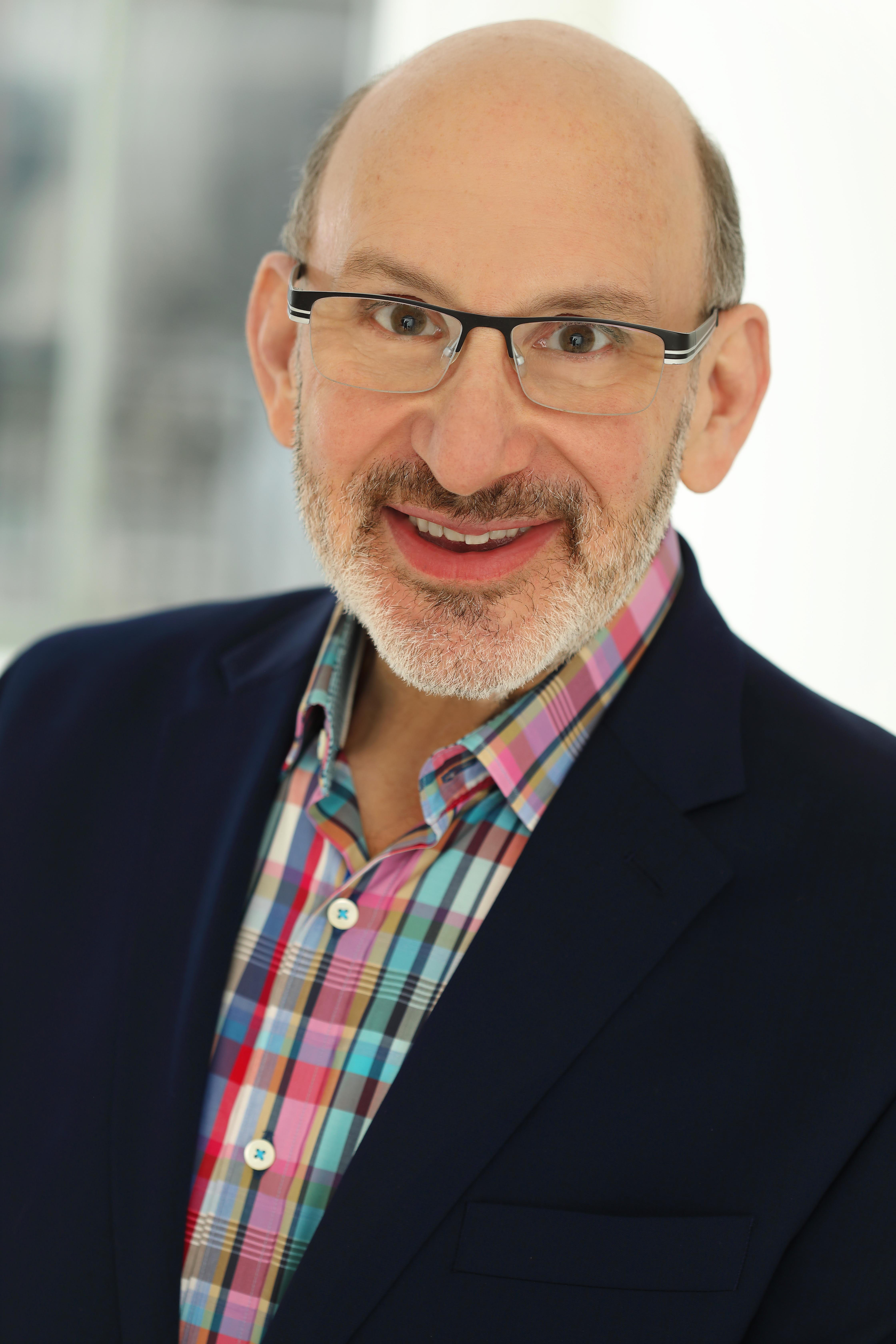
Bob Marks

Marks has taught across the United States, including at the American Musical and Dramatic Academy, the Contemporary Commercial Music Vocal Pedagogy Institute at Shenandoah Conservatory in Virginia, the Steinhardt School of Education at New York University, and Nashville's Belmont University. He has given workshops in both the United Kingdom and France, and has taught for the Broadway Mentors Program in Sommerville, New Jersey. Marks is a member of the American Society of Composers, Authors, and Publishers (ASCAP), the National Association of Teachers of Singing (NATS) and the New York Singing Teachers’ Association (NYSTA), where he was a founding member of the Music Theatre Committee. Additionally, he has music directed over 200 stage productions, including Off-Broadway, and was the associate conductor of the St. Louis Municipal Opera for two seasons. He also arranged and performed the music for several albums in Ben Bagley's Painted Smiles Records Revisited series.

Marks has trained performers who have appeared in numerous Broadway musicals, including An American in Paris, The Book of Mormon, Chicago, Disaster!, Finding Neverland, Jersey Boys, The Lion King, The King and I, Kinky Boots, Mamma Mia!, Matilda, The Phantom of the Opera, Rock of Ages, School of Rock, Tuck Everlasting, and Wicked. Additionally, Marks's students have performed on American Idol, The Voice, and America's Got Talent.

He is highly lauded by those in the theater community, including Actor Sarah Jessica Parker, who said Marks "gave [her] self-confidence," director and lyricist Martin Charnin, who said Marks "expertly coaches actors for the singing auditions," and Seth Riggs, the creator of speech level singing, who said Marks "has a knack for selecting just the right songs and styles to make his people shine."
