= The Blue Angel (New York nightclub) =

Venue in New York (1943–1964)

The Blue Angel, also known as the Blue Angel Supper Club, was a New York City nightclub founded in April 1943 and closed in 1964. It was located at 152 East 55th Street between Lexington and Third Avenue. Many artists would go to perform in the club and artists such as Vaughn Meader had their careers launched at the Angel.

== History ==
The Blue Angel was founded by Max Gordon, founder of Greenwich Village's venue, the Village Vanguard, which opened in 1934. The Blue Angel was co-owned by Herbert Jacoby. The duo, as Her‐Max, Inc., invested $5,000 each to open the club. A touch of interior design included a blue cherub—a blue angel—on the stage proscenium. Curt Weinberg acted as publicist. At capacity, the club held 150 people. The kitchen served gourmet food.

The Blue Angel was a desegregated club, then a rarity. It was one of the venues at which Edith Piaf made one of her first performance appearances in the United States. Singers Irene Bordoni, Mildred Bailey, Mabel Mercer, and pianist Bobby Short performed at the venue in 1945. In 1946, actress, singer, dancer, and impressionist Florence Desmond debuted at the club. Eddie Mayehoff also performed on the bill. The "celebrated balladeer" Richard Dyer-Bennet performed there in 1946. Also in 1946, the Navy Flight Demonstration Squadron saw an advertisement for the club in the magazine The New Yorker, prompting them to rename themselves the Blue Angels.

Other acts of the time to perform there included The Great GabaGhoul, Eartha Kitt, Anita Ellis, Alice Ghostley and Barbara Cook; Kitt undertook a number of residencies at the club, including an eight-week stint in 1952 and an unprecedented 20-week run. Other stars appearing at the club included Pearl Bailey, Alice Pearce, Paula Laurence, and the Bernard Brothers.

In 1951, comedian Dorothy "Dot" Greener played the club, with the King Odom Quartet and The Mademoiselles on the same bill. Throughout the 1950s, pianist Jimmy Lyon led a jazz trio at the club as well as provided piano accompaniment for all performers who brought their acts there, while Bart Howard, composer of "Fly Me to the Moon," played piano there as well, also acting as the club's "master of ceremonies," or director of shows, throughout the decade; "Fly Me to the Moon" is said to have debuted at the Angel in 1954, as sung by Felicia Sanders. Indeed, Sanders recorded a live album at the club, Felicia Sanders at the Blue Angel. Likewise, Dorothy Loudon recorded an album there, Dorothy Loudon at the Blue Angel, and performed comedy at the club as well. Other stars to play the club included Harry Belafonte, the Weavers, Mort Sahl, Blossom Dearie, Martha Davis, and Johnny Mathis. In 1957, club impresario Spivy Le Voe, also known as Spivy, was coaxed to play the club.

== Notable performers ==
In 1960, Woody Allen made his debut at the Angel, introduced by comedian, actor, and writer, and teacher Shelley Berman, with French-American entertainer Jean-Paul Vignon on the same bill. In 1961, Dick Gregory made his New York debut at the club, also recording a live comedy set there, "Dick Gregory at the Blue Angel", for his album East & West. In 1962, comedian Vaughn Meader played the club. In the early 1960s, individuals such as Barbra Streisand, Phyllis Diller, Carol Burnett, and comedian Bob Lewis appeared at the club, as did Elaine May, Mike Nichols, and the Canadian musical act Ian & Sylvia, composed of Ian Tyson and Sylvia Fricker. It was while performing at the Angel that Carol Burnett was discovered by talent scouts from The Jack Paar Show and The Ed Sullivan Show. Gale Garnett made her New York debut at the Angel in 1963. Comedian and actor Godfrey Cambridge and The Tonight Show Starring Johnny Carson alumna Kathy Woodruff appeared at the Angel. In the same time period, Peter, Paul, & Mary played the club.

== Closure ==
The club filed for bankruptcy in April 1964. In an attempt to help save it, comedian Vaughn Meader, whose career started at the Angel, held a show there and only accepted union wages so that the show revenue could go directly to keeping the club afloat; he even considered buying the club but came to the realization that he could not afford it. The club closed in 1964, partly because television was "making serious inroads on the talent pool available to nightclubs", hence affecting business at the Angel. The establishment was sold to hotel entrepreneur Ed Wynne, who at first planned on making it a restaurant but ultimately converted the space into a go-go club called The Phone Booth.
