= Casey Roberts =

American set decorator (1901–1949)

- Born: May 9, 1901; Illinois
- Died: May 29, 1949 (aged 48); Los Angeles, California
- Other name: Edwin Casey Roberts
- Occupation: Set decorator
- Years active: 1917-1949
- Partner: Bruz Fletcher

Casey Roberts (May 9, 1901 – May 29, 1949) was an American set decorator. He was nominated for three Academy Awards in the category Best Art Direction. He was born in Illinois and died in Los Angeles, California.

== Selected filmography ==
Roberts was nominated for three Academy Awards for Best Art Direction:

- Captains of the Clouds (1942)
- George Washington Slept Here (1942)
- Joan of Arc (1948)
