= Liberty Music Shop Records =

US record label

Liberty Music Shop Records was a record label formed in New York City in 1933. Its catalogue included Lee Wiley and Ethel Waters.

At one time in the late 1930s, Liberty had three shops in New York City. They imported a number of records from the UK, as copies of British His Master's Voice's and Decca's have been found with large Liberty Music Shop stickers covering the foreign logos.

In 1933, they started their own private recording label, using original masters recorded at Brunswick Records and later Decca studios. They specialized in dance music (Enric Madriguera, Freddy Martin, Emile Petti and Ted Straeter); cabaret and Broadway personalities (Beatrice Lillie, Ramona, Mabel Mercer, Ethel Merman, Cy Walter, Ethel Waters, and Lee Wiley); and niche acts like Casper Reardon and Bruz Fletcher. About 200 records were produced between 1933 and 1942. In the 1950s the label produced LP reissues.

== See also ==
- List of record labels
