= Jane Sherman =

American writer, performer, composer and dancer

- Born: June 14, 1908; Beloit, Wisconsin
- Died: March 16, 2010 (aged 101); Englewood, New Jersey
- Occupations: Writer, dancer, composer

Jane Sherman (June 14, 1908 – March 16, 2010) was an American writer, performer, composer, and one-time dancer and member of the Rockettes the famed in-house dance troupe of Radio City Music Hall. She was a former member and authority of Denishawn, the eclectic company, founded by Ruth St. Denis and Ted Shawn in 1915. She performed with companies ranging from modern-dance groups to the Radio City Music Hall Rockettes.

== Early life ==
Sherman was born in Beloit, Wisconsin, on June 14, 1908, to Horace Humphrey Sherman, an advertising writer, and Florentine St. Clair, an opera singer. The family moved to New York City in 1921, where Jane began studying dancing, after she saw a St. Denis program that included "Brahms Waltz and Liebesträume", a solo that inspired her to study at the New York Denishawn School.

== Career ==
=== Dancing ===
From 1927 to 1928, she joined the Ziegfeld Follies and toured with the troupe, and later returned to modern dance as a member of the Humphrey-Weidman Company in 1928. She also appeared in Broadway revues and was a Rockette in 1934 and 1935.

=== Editing ===
After her dance career ended, she became a fiction editor at Seventeen magazine in the 1940s.

== Personal life ==
In 1940, Jane Sherman married Ned Lehac, a high school Science Teacher who was also a composer and lyricist for revues, contributing material to 14 shows from 1930 to 1942. In the 1990s they moved together to the Lillian Booth Actors Home, run by the Actors Fund, where he died in 1999, aged 99.

In 2003, Jane began publishing poems, gathering them into little books, some of which commented on aging. In a poem from her self-published book "Songs of Senescence".

== Death ==
On March 16, 2010, Sherman died at the age of 101.
