= Ned Lehac =

Ned Lehac (born Nathan Levin, September 3, 1899 – January 23, 1999) was an American composer and songwriter. He contributed music to 14 revues staged in New York from 1930 to 1942. After retiring from working as a theater composer he worked as a high school science teacher. His chief collaborators included lyricists Allen Boretz and Edward Eliscu. His papers are held in Music Division of The New York Public Library.

== Biography ==
The son of Morris and Anna Levin, Nathan Levin was born in New York City on September 3, 1899. He served in the United States military during World War I, and then studied at the City College of New York (CCNY) where he graduate with a Bachelor of Science degree. While at CCNY he wrote the music to the musical Bye Bye Beowulf which was staged by Edward Eliscu at the Morosco Theatre in 1920. He was billed as Ned Levin. The cast was made up of students from the senior class of CCNY and used a book by Francis Faragoh.

Lehac contributed music to 14 revues staged in New York from 1930 to 1942. With lyricist Allen Boretz he contributed multiple songs to the 1930 iteration of The Garrick Gaieties at the Garrick Theatre; including "Beauty", "Love Is Like That", "Four Infant Prodigies" (sung by Rosalind Russell and Edith Meiser), "Got It Again", and "I've Got It Again". Lehac and Boretz also wrote the song "Ten Minutes in Bed" which was interpolated into the musical Sweet and Low (1930, Chanin's 46th Street Theatre).

In collaboration with lyricist Edward Eliscu, Lehac wrote the song "Boudoir Dolls" for Nine-Fifteen Revue (1930, George M. Cohan's Theatre). The pair also wrote the songs "Sevilla" and "You Forgot Your Gloves" for the musical The Third Little Show (1931, Music Box Theatre), and the song "Have a Little Drinkee" for Billy Rose's Crazy Quilt (1931, 44th Street Theatre). Lehac also contributed music to the Billy Rose's revues at Casa Manana. This included the revue Let's Play Fair (1938) which used music co-written by Lehac and Dana Suesse with lyrics by Ted Fetter and Billy Rose.

With composer Lee Wainer, Lehac co-wrote the music to the revue Sing for Your Supper (1939, Adelphi Theatre) which used lyrics by Robert Sour. One of Lehac and Sour's more successful songs from this show was "Papa's Got a Job" which also included lyrics contributed by Harold Rome using the pseudonym Hector Troy. With lyricist Joe Darion, Lehac wrote the song "Gertie the Stool Pigeon's Daughter which was sung by Eleanor Bagley in the revue Of V We Sing (1942, Concert Theatre). He also wrote the song "The Sun Will Shine Tonight."

Lehac married the dancer and writer Jane Sherman in 1940. He retired from composing for the theater in the early 1940s, and subsequently had a career as a high school science teacher. After retiring from teaching he purchased a home in Wellfleet, Massachusetts. At the end of his life he lived with his wife at the Lillian Booth Actors Home in Englewood, New Jersey where he continued to write songs during the 1990s.

Lehac died on January 23, 1999 in Englewood, New Jersey.
