= Alberto Rabagliati =

Italian singer (1906–1974)

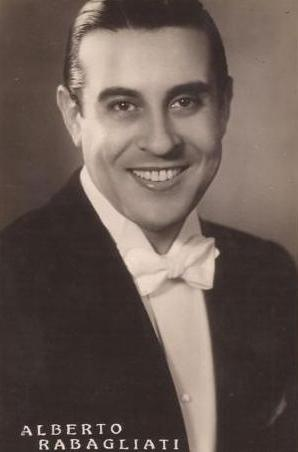
- Born: 27 June 1906; Milan, Italy
- Died: 8 March 1974 (aged 67); Rome, Italy
- Occupation: Actor

Alberto Rabagliati (27 June 1906 – 8 March 1974) was an Italian jazz singer.

== Early career ==
Alberto Rabagliati was born in Milan in 1906 from a Piedmontese family. His father, Leandro Valentino Rabagliati, and his mother, Delfina Besso, were both natives of Casorzo, a comune (municipality) in the hills of the Montferrat in the Province of Asti. In 1927, age 21, Rabagliati moved to Hollywood after winning a Rudolph Valentino look-alike contest. He later recalled: "For someone like me, who had seen no more than Lake Como or the Monza Cathedral, to find myself on board a luxury steamer with three cases full of clothes, a few rolls of dollars, and grand-duchesses and countesses flirting with me was something extraordinary". Rabagliati lived in America for four years hoping to work as an actor, but his career never took off. After being exposed to musical genres such as jazz, swing, and scat singing, he decided to move back to Europe and be a professional singer.

== Singing ==
Rebagliati moved to Rome in 1931. After a brief period with Pippo Barzizza's orchestra, in 1934 he joined the Lecuona Cuban Boys, a Cuban jazz band. He occasionally performed in blackface and scored a hit with the song "Maria la O".

During his tenure with the Lecuona Cuban Boys, Rebagliati met composer and conductor Giovanni D'Anzi, who suggested that he audition with the Italian state radio station EIAR. Rabagliati soon became a radio star, and in 1941 had his own weekly radio show, Canta Rabagliati ("Rabagliati sings"), where he would perform his most famous songs such as "Ma l'amore no", "Mattinata fiorentina", "Ba-Ba-Baciami Piccina", "Silenzioso slow" and "Bambina innamorata".

Rebagliati's Monday night radio show was so popular that his name was mentioned in the lyrics of songs such as La famiglia canterina, Quando canta Rabagliati and Quando la radio. At a time when anything foreign was banned, Rabagliati was allowed to maintain his American-influenced style. Indeed, the Fascist government decided to make use of his popularity by choosing his song "Sposi (c'è una casetta piccina)" ("Wed (there's a little home)") as their demographic campaign anthem.

In 1954 Rabagliati married Maria Antonietta Tonnini in Rome.

== Acting ==
Rebagliati's fame as a singer helped his acting career restart. From 1940 to 1965 he acted in some twenty films, including The Barefoot Contessa, Montecarlo and Il vedovo. In 1966, he starred in The Christmas That Almost Wasn't.

Rabagliati was active also on the stage until the mid-1950s. He performed in musical revues and comedies by Garinei and Giovannini.

His last public appearance was in 1974 as a guest in the TV show Milleluci hosted by Mina and Raffaella Carrà.

Rebagliati died of cerebral thrombosis in Rome.
