= Sing for Your Supper (musical) =

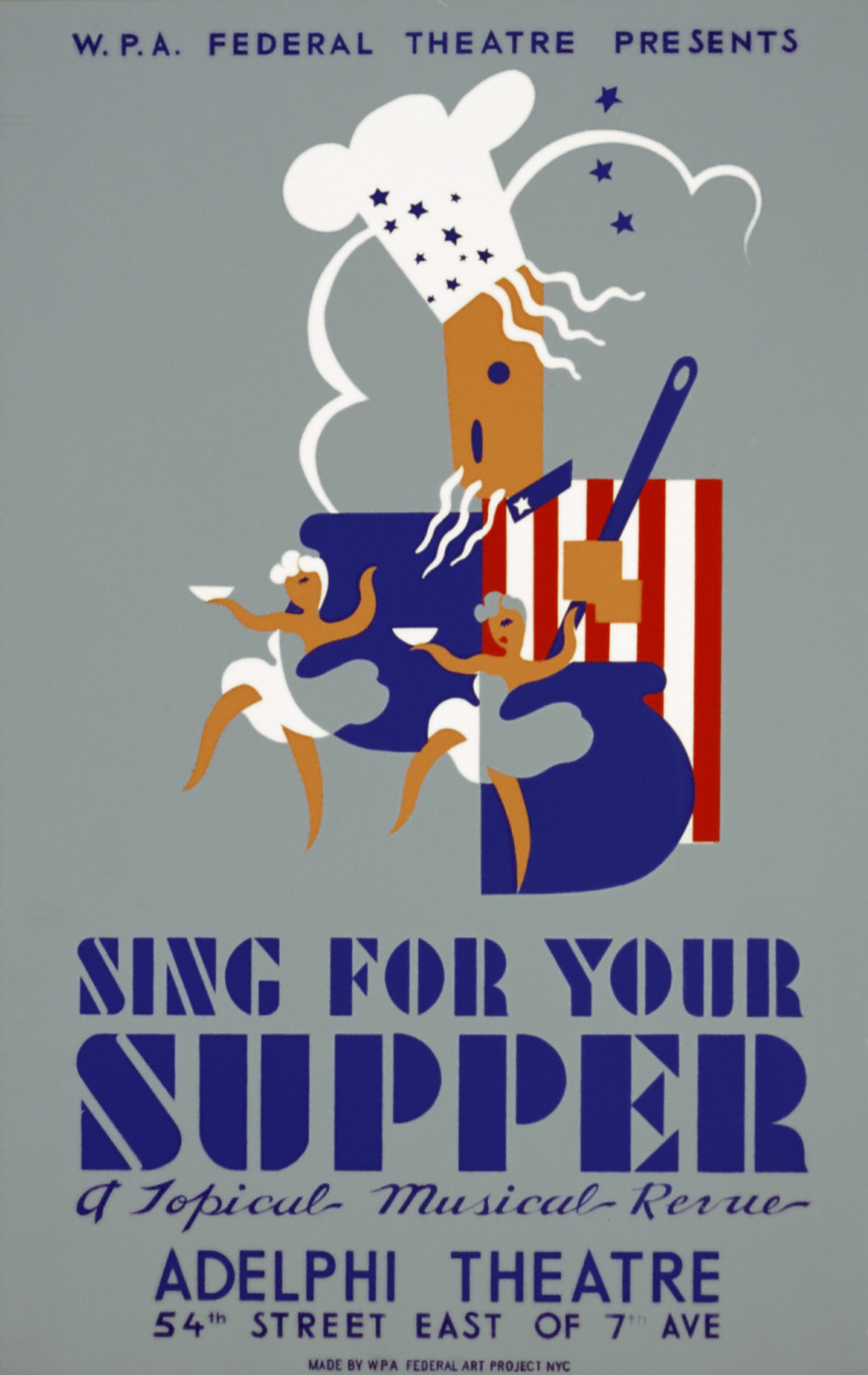
Poser for Sing for Your Supper.

Sing for Your Supper is a musical revue in two acts and twenty scences with music by Lee Wainer and Ned Lehac, lyrics by Robert Sour, and a book co-written by Harold Hecht, David Lesan, Turner Bullock, Charlotte Kent, and John La Touche. Mounted by the Federal Theatre Project, it opened on Broadway at the Adelphi Theatre on April 24, 1939. It ran there for 44 performances; closing on June 30, 1939. One of the notable songs in the show was "Ballad for Americans" (originally titled "Ballad for Uncle Sam"). The show was choreographed by Anna Sokolow. Some of the performers in the cast included Paula Laurence and Edwin Cooper among many others.
