= Botch-a-Me (Ba-Ba-Baciami Piccina) =

"Ba-Ba-Baciami Piccina"

Song by Alberto Rabagliati
- Language: Italian
- English title: "Botch-a-Me"
- Written: 1940
- Composer: Luigi Astore
- Lyricists: Riccardo Morbelli (Italian), Eddie Stanley (English)

"Botch-a-Me" is a popular song, written in 1940. The original Italian version ("Ba-Ba-Baciami Piccina") by Alberto Rabagliati was written by Riccardo Morbelli (words) and Luigi Astore (music). English lyrics were written by Eddie Stanley. Baciami in Italian means "kiss me".

The song was popularized by Rosemary Clooney in 1952. The recording was released by Columbia Records as catalog number 39767. The record first reached the Billboard magazine charts on June 20, 1952, and lasted 17 weeks on the chart, peaking at number two.

== In popular culture ==
- Rosemary Clooney's recording of the song plays over the closing credits of "Red in the Face," the seventh episode of the first season of Mad Men (2007), playing as Don Draper walks away after successfully executing an elaborate prank on Roger Sterling.
