= Lee Wiley =

American jazz singer (1908–1975)

Background information
- Born: October 9, 1908; Fort Gibson, Oklahoma, U.S.
- Died: December 11, 1975 (aged 67) New York City
- Genres: Jazz
- Occupation: Singer
- Years active: 1920s–1950s
- Spouses: Jess Stacy (m. 1943; div. 1948) Nat Tischenkel (m. 1966)

Lee Wiley (October 9, 1908 – December 11, 1975) was an American jazz singer during the 1930s, 1940s, and 1950s.

== Biography ==
Wiley was born in Fort Gibson, Oklahoma. At fifteen, she left home to pursue a singing career, singing on New York City radio stations. Her career was interrupted by a fall while horseback riding. She suffered temporary blindness but recovered. At the age of 19 she was a member of the Leo Reisman Orchestra, with whom in 1931 she recorded three songs: "Take It from Me", "Time On My Hands", and her composition "Got the South in My Soul".

Wiley began her radio career at KVOO in Tulsa, Oklahoma. She sang on the Mrs. Eleanor Roosevelt program on NBC in 1932, and was featured on Victor Young's radio show in 1933. From June 10, 1936, until September 2, 1936, she had her own show, Lee Wiley, on CBS.

In 1939, Wiley recorded eight Gershwin songs on 78s with a small group for Liberty Music Shop Records. The set sold well and was followed by 78s dedicated to the music of Cole Porter (1940) and Richard Rodgers & Lorenz Hart (1940 and 1954), Harold Arlen (1943), and 10" LPs dedicated to the music of Vincent Youmans and Irving Berlin (1951).

She sang with Paul Whiteman and later, the Casa Loma Orchestra. A collaboration with composer Victor Young resulted in several songs for which Wiley wrote the lyrics, including "Got the South in My Soul" and "Anytime, Anyday, Anywhere."

On October 11, 1963, Bob Hope Theater on NBC-TV presented "Something About Lee Wiley". Piper Laurie portrayed Wiley in the episode, which was produced by Revue Studios. Wiley's singing voice was provided by Joy Bryan.

== Personal life ==
Lee Wiley was born with last name Willey. Lee was a citizen of the Cherokee Nation and was buried in her family plot in Cherokee Nation. Wiley married the jazz pianist Jess Stacy in 1943. The couple was described by their friend Deane Kincaide as being as "compatible as two cats, tails tied together, hanging over a clothesline"; they divorced in 1948. Her response to Stacy's desire to get a divorce was, "What will Bing Crosby be thinking of you divorcing me?", while Stacy said of Wiley, "They did not burn the last witch at Salem."

She later married retired businessman Nat Tischenkel in 1966.

Wiley died of cancer on December 11, 1975 at Sloan-Kettering Memorial Hospital in New York City at the age of 67. Her obituary notes her last public performance was at the Newport Jazz Festival in July 1972.

== Discography ==
- Night in Manhattan with Bobby Hackett and Joe Bushkin (Columbia, 1951)
- Lee Wiley Sings Vincent Youmans (Columbia, 1952)
- Lee Wiley Sings Irving Berlin (Columbia, 1952)
- Lee Wiley Sings Rodgers & Hart (Storyville, 1954)
- Duologue with Ellis Larkins (Storyville, 1954)
- West of the Moon (RCA Victor, 1957)
- A Touch of the Blues (RCA, 1958)
- Back Home Again (Monmouth Evergeen, 1971)
- On the Air (Totem, 1977)
- The Complete Session of April 10, 1940 with Benny Berigan (Blu-Disc, 1984)
- Live on Stage: Town Hall, New York (Audiophile, 2007)
