= Dorothy Greener =

English-born American actress (1917–1971)

- Born: 16 October 1917; Gateshead, England
- Died: 6 December 1971 (aged 54); New York City, New York, U.S.
- Other names: Dot Greener
- Occupations: Actress; singer; comedian; journalist

Dorothy "Dot" Greener (16 October 1917 – 6 December 1971) was an English-born American actress and singing comedian.

== Early life ==
Greener was born 16 October 1917, in Gateshead, England. When she was eight years old, her family emigrated to Montreal, Canada. Waiting for the immigration quotas took three years, but the family was finally able to move from Montreal to East Hartford, Connecticut. There, she studied viola. She also learned the violin and ukulele at one point.

== Career ==
Having taken a bookkeeping class at East Hartford High School, Greener was able to gain employment at a drug company. Within seven years she became head of the billing department. She then won a sculpture scholarship at the Hartford Art School, but veered into journalism, working as secretary to the managing editor at The Hartford Times, though she also became a writer, creating human interest stories and writing reviews. Four years into the job, she quit and moved to New York.

In New York, Greener supported herself as a switchboard operator and secretary. Then, while on vacation in Provincetown, Massachusetts, she won a bottle of champagne by singing two original songs, "Oi Should 'Ave Let 'Im 'Ave It With Me 'Atpin" and "Mame of the Chorus." This was her breakthrough, and she was hired to sing for the rest of her stay at the hotel.

Greener's career then included off-Broadway and Broadway stints, including the productions Come What May, Razzle Dazzle, Leave It to Jane, The Shoestring Revue (1955), Shoestring '57 (1956, Barbizon-Plaza, New York). and My Mother, My Father and Me. She also performed at New York's Blue Angel nightclub, with the King Odom Quartet and The Mademoiselles on the same bill. Her film and television credits include Don Ameche's Musical Playhouse, Lux Video Theatre, Cauliflower Cupids, and Camera Three.

== Death and legacy ==
Greener died of cancer on Dec. 6, 1971 at St. Vincent's Hospital. Her personal papers are held in the New York Public Library's Archives & Manuscripts Department.
