= Paula Laurence =

American actress and journalist

- Died: New York, NY
- Occupation: Actress
- Spouse: Charles Bowden (m. 1953; died 1996)

Paula Laurence (b. approx. 1916) was an American theatre actress and journalist.

== Career ==
Laurence's theatre debut was in Orson Welles's Federal Theatre Project production of Horse Eats Hat in 1937. She then played Helen of Troy in Dr. Faustus and performed in the Broadway revue Sing for Your Supper (1939) followed by a 1941 appearance in the Moss Hart-directed production of Junior Miss. She appeared in Something for the Boys in 1943, duetting with Ethel Merman, and One Touch of Venus, for which she sang the title song. As it was wartime, Laurence performed at the Stage Door Canteen. She also performed at the Blue Angel nightclub in New York.

Laurence also appeared in The Duchess Misbehaves, Cyrano de Bergerac, Volpone, Inside U.S.A., The Insect Comedy, The Liar, Season in the Sun, Tovarich, The Time of Your Life, The Night of the Iguana, and Have I Got a Girl For You!, among others. In 1966 she appeared alongside John Gielgud and Vivien Leigh in Ivanov.

Off-Broadway, Laurence performed in Sweet Adeline, George White's Scandals, Jubilee, Sitting Pretty, and others.

On television, Laurence made appearances on Dark Shadows and Law & Order. She was also a board member of New Dramatists.

Laurence's second career was in journalism; she became a contributor to Mademoiselle, Vogue, Cue, Harper's Bazaar, and Playbill.

== Personal life ==
Laurence was briefly engaged to Moss Hart. She was married for 30 years to Charles Bowden.

== Death ==
Laurence died at St. Luke's Hospital on Oct. 29, 2005 after a brief decline in health following the breaking of her hip. She was rumored to be between the ages of 89 and 93.
