= KT Sullivan =

American singer and actress

KT Sullivan is an American singer and actress known for her performances in cabaret and musical theatre.

== Early years ==
Born Kathleen Sullivan in Coalgate, Oklahoma to Elizabeth, a poet and composer, and James A. Sullivan, a director of the Agricultural Stabilization and Conservation Service in Norman, Oklahoma, she performed with her family as the Sullivan Family Gospel Singers.

After attending the University of Oklahoma, she studied opera in Italy and California, but the Broadway songs sung by Barbara Cook led her in a different musical direction.

== Cabaret ==
Sullivan performs her cabaret act in venues such as the Laurie Beechman Theater and the Oak Room at the Algonquin Hotel in New York City, the Nikko Hotel and three West Coast Cabaret Conventions in San Francisco, and The Pheasantry and The Crazy Coqs at the Brasserie Zedel in London. In a review of her appearance at the Oak Room in 2007, Rex Reed said, "Larky and luscious as ever, she's also singing better."

All the Things You Are, Sullivan's 2008 cabaret show at the Oak Room, featured the work of Jerome Kern. Stephen Holden of The New York Times wrote that "Ms. Sullivan ... has a fluttery, semioperatic soprano that gives Kern's most famous melodies their due. But her primary goal on Thursday was to bring his songs down to earth without damaging them." In October 2008, she and frequent partner Mark Nadler performed their cabaret act Cole Porter & Friends at the South Orange Performing Arts Center in South Orange, New Jersey.

Another of her Oak Room shows, Dancing in the Dark, featured the works of Howard Dietz and Arthur Schwartz. In his March 2009 review, Holden wrote, "The ability to convey a sense of continual surprise and discovery while singing almost any standard is one of Ms. Sullivan's many gifts. That her light-operatic voice is as supple today as ever is her ace in the hole. A virtuoso at multiple styles of musical comedy who has refined a hundred variations of the double take, Ms. Sullivan can turn on a dime and deliver a formal rendition of "Dancing in the Dark" in which her luscious middle and lower registers supply serious drama."

In April 2012, Sullivan was named artistic director of the Mabel Mercer Foundation.

== Theatre ==
On Broadway, Sullivan appeared as Suky Tawdry in the 1989 revival of The Threepenny Opera and as Lorelei Lee in the 1995 revival of Gentlemen Prefer Blondes. She toured in Annie Get Your Gun with Cathy Rigby and also performed in Sugar and Born Yesterday. She, Mark Nadler, and Ruth Leon wrote American Rhapsody: A New Musical Revue, which she and Nadler performed at the off-Broadway Triad Theatre between November 2000 and June 2002. The musical was nominated for the Lucille Lortel Award for Outstanding Musical of 2001 and the Drama Desk Award for Outstanding Musical Revue of 2000-2001 and won the MAC Award for Best Musical Revue. She also appeared in the New York City productions A... My Name Is Alice in 1984 and 1992 and Splendora in 1995, and performed in the Musicals Tonight concert presentations of So Long, 174th Street and By the Beautiful Sea in 1999 and Fifty Million Frenchmen in 2006.

In regional theatre, Sullivan appeared in You Never Know in 1996 at the Paper Mill Playhouse in Millburn, New Jersey, and she has performed at the Old Globe Theatre, the Hartford Stage Company, the Municipal Opera of St. Louis, the Goodspeed Opera House, and the Great Lakes Theater Festival.

In the West End, Sullivan appeared in Vienna to Weimar in 2004 and has performed in revues celebrating the songs of Noël Coward and Irving Berlin.

== Recordings ==
Sullivan has recorded albums with Nadler, including Always: The Love Story of Irving Berlin, A Fine Romance: A Dorothy Fields Songbook (2006) and A Swell Party: Cole Porter (2007). Her solo recordings include Crazy World (1993), Sing My Heart: The Songs of Harold Arlen (1995), In Other Words, The Songs of Bart Howard (1997), KT Sullivan, Ladies of the Silver Screen (2002), and KT Sullivan Sings the Sweetest Sounds of Richard Rodgers. She also recorded the revival cast album of Gentlemen Prefer Blondes. Her latest CD, "Timeless Tunes with Jon Weber" was recorded in 2009.

== Personal life ==
Sullivan married business communications consultant Stephen Miner Downey (President of the New York Browning Society) at St. Joseph's Roman Catholic Church in New York City on November 27, 1999.
