= Ben Bagley =

American record producer (1933–1998)

Ben Bagley

Ben Bagley (October 18, 1933 – March 21, 1998) was an American musical theater producer and record producer.

== Early life ==
Ben Bagley was born on October 18, 1933, in Burlington, Vermont. He was first exposed to musical comedy by annual trips to Broadway, where his mother bought sheet music in theater lobbies. At age 16, he moved to New York City to break into musical theater. He worked as an office boy at McGraw-Hill.

== Career ==
In 1955, at age 22, Bagley produced his first hit, Shoestring Revue, starring (among others) Beatrice Arthur and Chita Rivera (and, later, Jane Connell), and with songs by Charles Strouse, Lee Adams, June Carroll, and Sheldon Harnick.

The glowing notices from Shoestring enabled him to mount a more lavish and sophisticated revue, The Littlest Revue, off-Broadway in 1956. This revue featured the young, unknown Joel Grey, Larry Storch, and Charlotte Rae, as well as Tammy Grimes making her off-Broadway debut. Contributing lyricists and composers included Vernon Duke, John Latouche, Ogden Nash and others. Particularly memorable was a snappy number by Sammy Cahn and Vernon Duke, called "Good Little Girls." Performed by flame-haired newcomer Beverly Bozeman, this song had originally been written for Bette Davis in a 1952 revue, Two's Company." Resurrecting unused and forgotten songs by major songwriters eventually became a hallmark of Bagley shows and recordings. The Littlest Revue closed after 32 performances, possibly because its venue, the Phoenix Theatre at 2nd Avenue and 12th Street, was too inaccessible for the casual theatergoer. Critics noted the revue's pleasant songs and dull, overlong sketches.

He returned a few months later with Shoestring '57 at the Barbizon-Plaza on Central Park South, and this turned out to be his most successful show yet with 119 performances. He went on to produce other shows for summer stock and nightclubs.

Shortly after his 1958 Shoestring Revue in Fort Worth, Bagley was diagnosed with tuberculosis. During the two years he spent recovering in the Will Rogers Hospital in Los Angeles, his best friend, Arthur Siegel, sent him tapes of obscure songs by well-known Broadway songwriters, which inspired his second career as a record producer. Bagley began recording albums which he licensed to various companies. His first was Rodgers and Hart Revisited, on Spruce Records, a partnership with Michael McWhinney. Bagley then worked with Recording Industries Corporation, Columbia, JJC Records, MGM, Crewe and others.

Bagley's off-Broadway revue The Decline and Fall of the Entire World as Seen Through the Eyes of Cole Porter drew on the composer's lesser-known songs. It ran off-Broadway from March 1965 to November 1965 for 273 performances at Square East (West Fourth Street). It starred Carmen Alvarez, Kaye Ballard, William Hickey, Harold Lang, and Elmarie Wendel. It then ran for 13 months in San Francisco before moving to the regional theater stage. According to Variety, the show "helped pave the way for later Broadway revues like Ain't Misbehavin' and Sophisticated Ladies, which surveyed the work of a single composer."

In 1971 Bagley founded his own recording label, Painted Smiles Records, and through it reissued those albums and several newer ones, producing dozens of long-playing records and 48 compact discs. Most of Painted Smiles' production consisted of the Revisited series, which presented lesser-known songs written by the likes of Harold Arlen, DeSylva, Brown & Henderson, Vernon Duke, Jerome Kern, Cole Porter, Richard Rodgers & Lorenz Hart and Kurt Weill. These albums contained performances by some of the leading Broadway and nightclub singers of the day, as well as many great theatre and film actors and other show-business personalities not generally known for their singing ability.

== Personal life and death ==
Bagley shared credits on his Painted Smiles recordings with his beloved cats, Butch, Fogerty (c. 1971-1990) and Emily.

He died of emphysema at home in Jackson Heights, Queens, NY, on March 21, 1998, at age 64.
