= Mabel Mercer =

English cabaret singer (1900–1984)

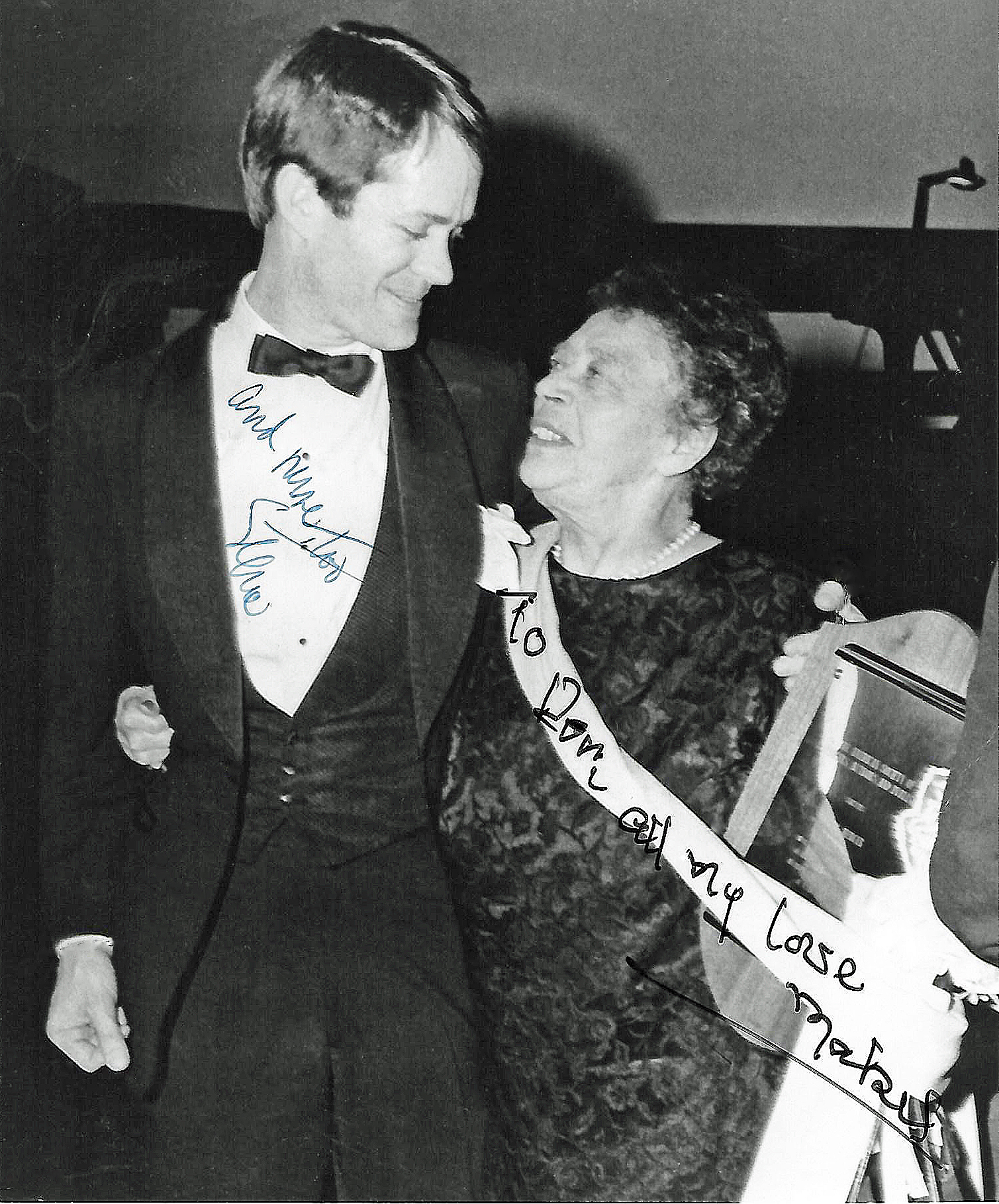

Background information
- Born: 3 February 1900; Burton upon Trent, Staffordshire, England
- Died: 20 April 1984 (aged 84) Pittsfield, Massachusetts, US
- Genres: Jazz, cabaret
- Occupation: Singer
- Label: Liberty Music Shop
- Website: mabelmercer.org

Mabel Mercer (3 February 1900 – 20 April 1984) was an English-born cabaret singer who performed in the United States, Britain, and Europe with the greats in jazz and cabaret. She was a featured performer at Chez Bricktop in Paris, owned by the hostess Ada "Bricktop" Smith, and performed in such clubs as Le Ruban Bleu, Tony's, the RSVP, the Carlyle, the St. Regis Hotel, and eventually her own room, the Byline Club. Among those who frequently attended Mercer's shows was Frank Sinatra, who made no secret of his emulating her phrasing and story-telling techniques.

== Early life ==
Mabel Mercer was born on 3 February 1900 in Burton upon Trent, Staffordshire, England. Her mother was a young, white English music hall performer, and her father was an itinerant black American musician, who died before she was born. At the age of 14, she left her convent school in Manchester, and toured Britain and Europe with her aunt in vaudeville and music hall engagements. Her precise vocal styling was believed to be the result of diction training while a student at the convent.

== Career ==
In 1928, she was an unknown member of the black chorus in the London production of Show Boat, but she had become the toast of Paris by the 1930s, with admirers who included Ernest Hemingway, Gertrude Stein, F. Scott Fitzgerald, and Cole Porter.

When World War II broke out, she traveled to America to sing in the finest supper clubs in New York. Mercer's earliest recordings were selections from Porgy and Bess, released in 1942 on the elite Liberty Music Shops label, featuring piano accompaniment by Cy Walter.

It was not until the following decade that she began recording more consistently. The years 1952 to 1954 saw the release of her first full-length albums, Songs by Mabel Mercer, volumes 1-3. By 1960, four more LPs had followed. In the late 1960s, she gave two concerts with Bobby Short at Town Hall in New York City. Both were released by Atlantic Records: Mabel Mercer & Bobby Short at Town Hall, in 1968, (Atlantic SD 2-604) and Mabel Mercer & Bobby Short Second Town Hall Concert, in 1969 (Atlantic SD 2-605). In 1969, she made two appearances on the television program Mister Rogers' Neighborhood.

Her original and reissued albums are collector's items. Atlantic Records reissued four of her early LPs in a boxed set in 1975, in honor of her 75th birthday. She was awarded Stereo Review Magazine's first Award for Merit, for her lifetime achievement and for "outstanding contributions to the quality of American musical life." This award was officially renamed the Mabel Mercer Award in 1984.

== Late career ==
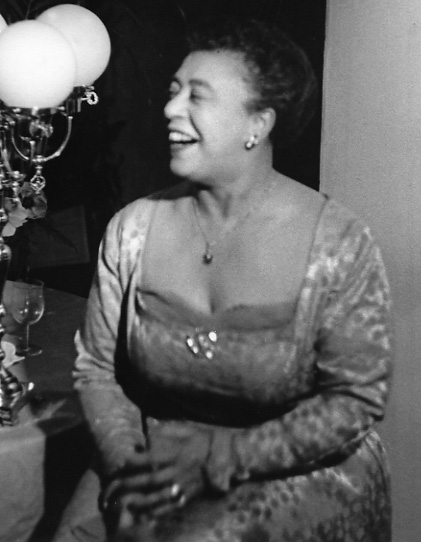
A photograph of Mercer in later life, from the archives of The Mabel Mercer Foundation.

When Mercer returned on 4 July 1977 for her first performance in England in 41 years, the BBC filmed three evenings' performances and later broadcast them in a week-long late-night television program, a BBC first for an entertainer. It was titled Miss Mercer in Mayfair.

In 1978, Midnight at Mabel Mercer's, her 1956 album on Atlantic, was praised as "one of the best recordings of the past twenty years" (although it was more than 20 years old at the time) by Stereo Review. That same year, Mercer played at San Francisco's Club Mocambo to sold-out audiences, in celebration of her 78th birthday.

In 1982, Mercer teamed up with her friend Eileen Farrell in concert as part of the Kool Jazz Festival.

== Honours ==
In January 1981, she was honoured by the Whitney Museum of American Art in New York with "An American Cabaret," the only musical event of its kind at that point in the museum's history. Mercer was the first guest on Eileen Farrell's new program on National Public Radio featuring great popular singers.

Mercer received the Presidential Medal of Freedom, the US's highest civilian medal, in 1983. When President Ronald Reagan presented it to her in a ceremony at the White House, he called her "a singer's singer" and "a living testament to the artfulness of the American song".

She also received two honorary Doctor of Music degrees: one from Boston's Berklee College of Music, the other from the New England Conservatory of Music.

== Death ==
Mercer died on 20 April 1984, aged 84, in Pittsfield, Massachusetts, and is buried at Red Rock Cemetery near Chatham, New York.

== The Mabel Mercer Foundation ==
In 1985, the Mabel Mercer Foundation was established with the efforts of her long-time friend and professional associate Donald F. Smith. This not-for-profit arts organization was formed to keep Mercer's memory alive, and to contribute to the art of cabaret performing by supporting artists and providing information resources. Its international activities include the debut of the London Cabaret Convention in 2004. The Foundation produced Noël Coward's 100th birthday celebration at Carnegie Hall. It also has a Young Person's Series to introduce young people to The Great American Songbook of popular classics.

== Filmography ==
=== Live concerts ===
- 1990: View Video VHS: Mabel Mercer: A Singer's Singer (reissued 2005 on DVD)
- 1991: View Video VHS: Mabel Mercer: An Evening with Mabel Mercer (a.k.a. Cabaret Artist "Now and Always") (as yet unissued on DVD)

=== As actress ===
- 1936: Tropical Trouble
- 1936: Everything Is Rhythm
- 1961: The Sand Castle

== Discography ==
- 1942: Porgy and Bess (3x10" 78-rpm set with Cy Walter & Todd Duncan; three songs by Mabel)
- c. 1945: You Better Go Now (unreleased private recording)
- 1953: Songs by Mabel Mercer, Vol. 1
- 1953: Songs by Mabel Mercer, Vol. 2
- 1953: Songs by Mabel Mercer, Vol. 3 (Written Especially For Her)
- 1955: Mabel Mercer Sings Cole Porter
- 1956: Midnight at Mabel Mercer's
- 1958: Once in a Blue Moon
- 1960: Merely Marvelous Mabel Mercer
- 1964: Mabel Mercer Sings
- 1965: The Art of Mabel Mercer (2x12" reissue of three 1953 10" Songs by Mabel Mercer LPs with one added track)
- 1968: At Town Hall (live recording, with Bobby Short)
- 1969: Second Town Hall Concert (live recording, with Bobby Short)
- 1974: For Always (reissue of 1964 Mabel Mercer Sings)
- 1975: A Tribute to Mabel Mercer on the Occasion of her 75th Birthday (4x12" reissue of four 1955–60 LPs in commemorative box)
- 1980: Echoes of My Life (her final studio recordings)
- 2002: Previously Unreleased Live Performances (Legendary Performers)

== Works or publications ==
=== Archival materials ===
- Mercer, Mabel. Mabel Mercer Papers, 1932–1984. 1932. OCLC 122534577
- Mercer, Mabel. Mabel Mercer Collection, 1932–1980. 1932. OCLC 122486173

=== Monographs ===
- Haskins, James. Mabel Mercer: A Life. New York: Atheneum, 1987. ISBN 978-0-689-11595-0 OCLC 16833675
- Cheney, Margaret. Midnight at Mabel's: The Mabel Mercer Story: Centennial Biography of the Great Song Stylist. Washington, DC: New Voyage, 2000. ISBN 978-0-615-11345-6 OCLC 44998437

=== Other ===
- "Mercer, Mabel." Encyclopedia of Popular Music, 4th ed. Ed. Colin Larkin. Oxford Music Online. Oxford University Press. 2006.
- Spiller, David. Mabel Mercer, cabaret singer: a fictional biography. 2013, 229pp. Available from Amazon Kindle.
- Bourne, Stephen. Black Poppies: Britain's Black Community and the Great War. The History Press, 2019.
