= List of Alfred Hitchcock Presents episodes =

Alfred Hitchcock Presents is an American television anthology series created, hosted and produced by Alfred Hitchcock, airing on CBS and NBC, alternately, between 1955 and 1962. It features dramas, thrillers, and mysteries. Hitchcock himself directed only 17 episodes during its run. In 1962, the show was succeeded by The Alfred Hitchcock Hour which aired on CBS until 1965. The series Alfred Hitchcock Presents was revived in 1985 and ran through 1990.

== Series overview ==
Season	Title	Episodes	Originally released			Rank	Rating
Season	Title	Episodes	First released	Last released	Network	Rank	Rating
1	Alfred Hitchcock Presents	39	October 2, 1955	June 24, 1956	CBS	—N/a	—N/a
2	Alfred Hitchcock Presents	39	September 30, 1956	June 23, 1957	CBS	6	33.9
3	Alfred Hitchcock Presents	39	October 6, 1957	June 29, 1958	CBS	12	30.3 (Tied with Cheyenne)
4	Alfred Hitchcock Presents	36	October 5, 1958	June 21, 1959	CBS	24	26.8
5	Alfred Hitchcock Presents	38	September 27, 1959	September 25, 1960	CBS	25	24.1
6	Alfred Hitchcock Presents	38	September 27, 1960	July 4, 1961	NBC	—N/a	—N/a
7	Alfred Hitchcock Presents	39 (Note: The 39th episode of season 7 was never broadcast.)	October 10, 1961	June 26, 1962	NBC	—N/a	—N/a
8	The Alfred Hitchcock Hour	32	September 20, 1962	May 24, 1963	CBS	—N/a	—N/a
9	The Alfred Hitchcock Hour	32	September 27, 1963	July 3, 1964	CBS	—N/a	—N/a
10	The Alfred Hitchcock Hour	29	October 5, 1964	May 10, 1965	NBC	—N/a	—N/a

== Season 1 (1955–56) ==
No. overall	No. in season	Title	Directed by	Written by	Stars	Original release date
1	1	"Revenge"	Alfred Hitchcock	Story by : Samuel Blas; Teleplay by : Francis Cockrell	Ralph Meeker as Carl Spann, Vera Miles as Elsa Spann	October 2, 1955
2	2	"Premonition"	Robert Stevens	Harold Swanton	John Forsythe as Kim Stanger, Warren Stevens as Perry Stanger, Cloris Leachman as Susan Stanger	October 9, 1955
3	3	"Triggers in Leash"	Don Medford	Story by : Allen Vaughn Elston; Teleplay by : Dick Carr	Ellen Corby as Old Maggie Ryan, Gene Barry as Del Delaney, Darren McGavin as Red Hillman	October 16, 1955
4	4	"Don't Come Back Alive"	Robert Stevenson	Robert Dennis	Sidney Blackmer as Frank Partridge	October 23, 1955
5	5	"Into Thin Air" "The Vanishing Lady"	Don Medford	Marian Cockrell	Pat Hitchcock as Diana Winthrop	October 30, 1955
6	6	"Salvage"	Justus Addiss	Story by : Fred Freiberger; Teleplay by : Fred Freiberger & Dick Carr	Gene Barry as Dan Varrel, Nancy Gates as Lois Williams	November 6, 1955
7	7	"Breakdown"	Alfred Hitchcock	Story by : Louis Pollock; Teleplay by : Francis Cockrell & Louis Pollock	Joseph Cotten as William Callew	November 13, 1955
8	8	"Our Cook's a Treasure"	Robert Stevens	Story by : Dorothy L. Sayers; Teleplay by : Robert C. Dennis	Everett Sloane as Ralph Montgomery, Beulah Bondi as Mrs. Sutton	November 20, 1955
9	9	"The Long Shot"	Robert Stevenson	Harold Swanton	Peter Lawford as Charles 'Charlie' Ffolliot Raymond, John Williams as Walker Hendricks/English Jim	November 27, 1955
10	10	"The Case of Mr. Pelham"	Alfred Hitchcock	Story by : Anthony Armstrong; Teleplay by : Francis Cockrell	Tom Ewell as Albert Pelham (both real and fake)	December 4, 1955
11	11	"Guilty Witness"	Robert Stevens	Story by : Morris Hershman; Teleplay by : Robert C. Dennis	Judith Evelyn as Amelia Verber, Joseph Mantell as Stanley Crane, Kathleen Maguire as Dorothy Crane	December 11, 1955
12	12	"Santa Claus and the Tenth Avenue Kid"	Don Weis	Story by : Margaret Cousins; Teleplay by : Marian Cockrell	Barry Fitzgerald as Harold "Stretch" Sears	December 18, 1955
13	13	"The Cheney Vase"	Robert Stevens	Robert Blees	Patricia Collinge as Martha Cheney, Darren McGavin as Lyle Endicott	December 25, 1955
14	14	"A Bullet for Baldwin"	Justus Addiss	Story by : Joseph Ruscoll; Teleplay by : Eustace and Francis Cockrell	John Qualen as Mr. Benjamin Stepp	January 1, 1956
15	15	"The Big Switch"	Don Weis	Story by : Cornell Woolrich; Teleplay by : Richard Carr	George Mathews as Sam Dunleavy, Beverly Michaels as Goldie	January 8, 1956
16	16	"You Got to Have Luck"	Robert Stevens	Story by : S. R. Ross; Teleplay by : Eustace & Francis Cockrell	John Cassavetes as Sam Cobbett, Marisa Pavan as Mary Schaffner	January 15, 1956
17	17	"The Older Sister"	Robert Stevens	Story by : Lillian de la Torre; Teleplay by : Robert C. Dennis	Joan Lorring as Emma Borden, Carmen Mathews as Lizzie Borden, Polly Rowles as Nell Cutts	January 22, 1956
18	18	"Shopping for Death"	Robert Stevens	Ray Bradbury	Jo Van Fleet as Mrs. Shrike	January 29, 1956
19	19	"The Derelicts"	Robert Stevens	Story by : Terence Maples; Teleplay by : Robert C. Dennis	Robert Newton as Peter J. Goodfellow	February 5, 1956
20	20	"And So Died Riabouchinska"	Robert Stevenson	Story by : Ray Bradbury; Teleplay by : Mel Dinelli	Claude Rains as John Fabian, Charles Bronson as Detective Krovitch	February 12, 1956
21	21	"Safe Conduct"	Justus Addiss	Andrew Solt	Claire Trevor as Mary Prescott, Jacques Bergerac as Jan Gubak	February 19, 1956
22	22	"Place of Shadows"	Robert Stevens	Robert C. Dennis	Everett Sloane as Father Vincente	February 26, 1956
23	23	"Back for Christmas"	Alfred Hitchcock	Story by : John Collier; Teleplay by : Francis Cockrell	John Williams as Herbert Carpenter	March 4, 1956
24	24	"The Perfect Murder"	Robert Stevens	Story by : Stacey Aumonier; Teleplay by : Victor Wolfson	Hurd Hatfield as Paul Tallendier, Mildred Natwick as Aunt Rosalie Tallendier	March 11, 1956
25	25	"There Was an Old Woman"	Robert Stevenson	Story by : Jerry Hackady & Harold Hackady; Teleplay by : Marian Cockrell	Estelle Winwood as Monica Laughton	March 18, 1956
26	26	"Whodunit"	Francis Cockrell	Story by : C. B. Gilford; Teleplay by : Francis Cockrell & Marian Cockrell	John Williams as Alexander Penn Arlington	March 25, 1956
27	27	"Help Wanted"	James Neilson	Teleplay by : Robert C. Dennis; Based upon the Mary Orr and Reginald Denham adaptation of a story by : Stanley Ellin	John Qualen as Mr. Crabtree, Lorne Greene as Mr. X	April 1, 1956
28	28	"Portrait of Jocelyn"	Robert Stevens	Story by : Edgar Marvin; Teleplay by : Harold Swanton	Philip Abbott as Mark Halliday, Nancy Gates as Debbie Halliday, John Baragrey as Arthur Clymer / Detective Arbison	April 8, 1956
29	29	"The Orderly World of Mr. Appleby"	James Neilson	Story by : Stanley Ellin; Teleplay by : Victor Wolfson & Robert C. Dennis	Robert H. Harris as Laurence Appleby, Meg Mundy as Martha Sturgis-Appleby	April 15, 1956
30	30	"Never Again"	Robert Stevens	Story by : Adela Rogers St. Johns; Teleplay by : Gwen Bagni, Irwin Gielgud and Stirling Silliphant	Phyllis Thaxter as Karen Stewart, Louise Allbritton (credited as Louise Albritton) as Renee Marlow, Warren Stevens as Jeff Simmons	April 22, 1956
31	31	"The Gentleman from America"	Robert Stevens	Story by : Michael Arlen; Teleplay by : Francis Cockrell	Biff McGuire as Howard Latimer	April 29, 1956
32	32	"The Baby Sitter"	Robert Stevens	Story by : Emily Neff; Teleplay by : Sarett Rudley	Thelma Ritter as Lottie Slocum	May 6, 1956
33	33	"The Belfry"	Herschel Daugherty	Story by : Allan Vaughan Elston; Teleplay by : Robert C. Dennis	Jack Mullaney as Clint Ringle, Pat Hitchcock as Ellie Marsh	May 13, 1956
34	34	"The Hidden Thing"	Robert Stevens	Story by : A. J. Russell; Teleplay by : James Cavanagh	Biff McGuire as Dana Edwards, Robert H. Harris as John Hurley	May 20, 1956
35	35	"The Legacy"	James Neilson	Story by : Gina Kaus; Teleplay by : Gina Kaus & Andrew Solt	Leora Dana as Irene Cole, Jacques Bergerac as Prince Burhan	May 27, 1956
36	36	"Mink"	Robert Stevenson	Irwin Gielgud & Gwen Bagni	Ruth Hussey as Paula Hudson	June 3, 1956
37	37	"Decoy"	Arnold Laven	Story by : Richard George Pedicini; Teleplay by : Bernard C. Schoenfeld	Robert Horton as Gil Larkin, Cara Williams as Mona Cameron	June 10, 1956
38	38	"The Creeper"	Herschel Daugherty	Story by : Joseph Ruscoll; Teleplay by : James Cavanagh	Constance Ford as Ellen Grant, Steve Brodie as Steve Grant, Harry Townes as Ed	June 17, 1956
39	39	"Momentum"	Robert Stevens	Story by : Cornell Woolrich; Teleplay by : Francis Cockrell	Skip Homeier as Richard Paine, Joanne Woodward as Beth Paine	June 24, 1956

== Season 2 (1956–57) ==
No. overall	No. in season	Title	Directed by	Written by	Stars	Original release date
40	1	"Wet Saturday"	Alfred Hitchcock	Story by : John Collier; Teleplay by : Marian Cockrell	Sir Cedric Hardwicke as Mr. Princey, John Williams as Captain Smollet	September 30, 1956
41	2	"Fog Closing In"	Herschel Daugherty	Story by : Martin Brooke; Teleplay by : James Cavanagh	Phyllis Thaxter as Mary Hadley Summers, Paul Langton as Arthur Summers	October 7, 1956
42	3	"De Mortuis"	Robert Stevens	Story by : John Collier; Teleplay by : Francis Cockrell	Robert Emhardt as Professor Rankin, Cara Williams as Irene Rankin	October 14, 1956
43	4	"Kill with Kindness"	Herschel Daugherty	A. J. Russell	Hume Cronyn as Fitzhugh Oldham, Carmen Mathews as Katherine Oldham	October 21, 1956
44	5	"None Are So Blind"	Robert Stevens	Story by : John Collier; Teleplay by : James Cavanagh	Hurd Hatfield as Seymour Johnston, Mildred Dunnock as Aunt Muriel Drummond	October 28, 1956
45	6	"Toby"	Robert Stevens	Story by : Joseph Bates Smith; Teleplay by : Victor Wolfson	Jessica Tandy as Edwina Freel, Robert H. Harris as Albert Birch	November 4, 1956
46	7	"Alibi Me"	Jules Bricken	Story by : Therd Jefre and Walter Newman; Teleplay by : Bernard C. Schoenfeld	Lee Philips as Georgie Minnelli, Chick Chandler as Lucky Moore	November 11, 1956
47	8	"Conversation Over a Corpse"	Jules Bricken	Story by : Norman Daniels; Teleplay by : Marian Cockrell and Norman Daniels	Dorothy Stickney as Cissie Enright, Carmen Mathews as Joanna Enright, Ray Collins as Herbert Brenner	November 18, 1956
48	9	"Crack of Doom"	James Neilson	Story by : Don Marquis; Teleplay by : Robert C. Dennis	Robert Horton as Mason Bridges, Robert Middleton as Sam Klinker	November 25, 1956
49	10	"Jonathan"	John Meredyth Lucas	Story by : Fred Levan; Teleplay by : Bernard C. Schoenfeld and Stirling Silliphant	Georgann Johnson as Rosine Dalliford, Corey Allen as Gil Dalliford	December 2, 1956
50	11	"The Better Bargain"	Herschel Daugherty	Story by : Richard Deming; Teleplay by : Bernard C. Schoenfeld	Robert Middleton as Louis Koster, Henry Silva as Harry Silver	December 9, 1956
51	12	"The Rose Garden"	Francis Cockrell	Story by : Vincent Fotre; Teleplay by : Marian Cockrell	John Williams as Alexander Vinton, Patricia Collinge as Julia Pickering	December 16, 1956
52	13	"Mr. Blanchard's Secret"	Alfred Hitchcock	Story by : Emily Neff; Teleplay by : Sarett Rudley	Mary Scott as Babs Fenton, Robert Horton as John Fenton, Meg Mundy as Ellen Blanchard	December 23, 1956
53	14	"John Brown's Body"	Robert Stevens	Story by : Thomas Burke; Teleplay by : Robert C. Dennis	Hugh Marlowe as Harold Skinner, Russell Collins as John Brown, Leora Dana as Vera Brown	December 30, 1956
54	15	"Crackpot"	John Meredyth Lucas	Story by : Harold Gast; Teleplay by : Martin Berkeley	Biff McGuire as Ray Loomis, Robert Emhardt as Mr. Moon, Mary Scott as Meg Loomis	January 6, 1957
55	16	"Nightmare in 4-D"	Justus Addiss	Story by : Stuart Jerome; Teleplay by : Robert C. Dennis	Henry Jones as Harry Parker, Barbara Baxley as Miss Elliot, Virginia Gregg as Norma Parker	January 13, 1957
56	17	"My Brother, Richard"	Herschel Daugherty	Story by : Jay Bennett; Teleplay by : Sarett Rudley	Royal Dano as Martin Ross, Inger Stevens as Laura Ross, Harry Townes as Richard Ross	January 20, 1957
57	18	"The Manacled"	Robert Stevens	Story by : A. Sanford Wolfe; Teleplay by : Stirling Silliphant	Gary Merrill as Sergeant Rockwell, William Redfield as Stephen Fontaine	January 27, 1957
58	19	"A Bottle of Wine"	Herschel Daugherty	Story by : Borden Deal; Teleplay by : Stirling Silliphant	Herbert Marshall as Judge Connors, Robert Horton as Wallace Donaldson, Jarma Lewis as Grace Connors	February 3, 1957
59	20	"Malice Domestic"	John Meredyth Lucas	Story by : Philip MacDonald; Teleplay by : Victor Wolfson	Ralph Meeker as Carl Borden, Phyllis Thaxter as Annette Borden	February 10, 1957
60	21	"Number Twenty-Two"	Robert Stevens	Story by : Evan Hunter; Teleplay by : Joel Murcott	Russell Collins as the Skinner #21, Rip Torn as Steve Morgan #22	February 17, 1957
61	22	"The End of Indian Summer"	Robert Stevens	Story by : Maurice Baudin Jr. Teleplay by : James Cavanagh	Steve Forrest as Joe Rogers, Gladys Cooper as Mrs. Margarite Gillespie	February 24, 1957
62	23	"One for the Road"	Robert Stevens	Story by : Emily Neff; Teleplay by : Robert C. Dennis	John Baragrey as Charles Hendricks, Georgann Johnson as Beryl Abbott, Louise Platt as Marsha Hendricks	March 3, 1957
63	24	"The Cream of the Jest"	Herschel Daugherty	Story by : Fredric Brown; Teleplay by : Sarett Rudley	Claude Rains as Charles Gresham, James Gregory as Wayne Campbell	March 10, 1957
64	25	"I Killed the Count Part I"	Robert Stevens	Story by : Alec Coppel; Teleplay by : Francis Cockrell	John Williams as Inspector Davidson	March 17, 1957
65	26	"I Killed the Count Part II"	Robert Stevens	Story by : Alec Coppel; Teleplay by : Francis Cockrell	John Williams as Inspector Davidson	March 24, 1957
66	27	"I Killed the Count Part III"	Robert Stevens	Story by : Alec Coppel; Teleplay by : Francis Cockrell	John Williams as Inspector Davidson, Rosemary Harris as Louise Rogers / Helen Sorrington-Mattoni	March 31, 1957
67	28	"One More Mile to Go"	Alfred Hitchcock	Story by : F. J. Smith; Teleplay by : James Cavanagh	David Wayne as Sam Jacoby	April 7, 1957
68	29	"Vicious Circle"	Paul Henreid	Story by : Evan Hunter; Teleplay by : Bernard C. Schoenfeld	Dick York as Manny Coe, Kathleen Maguire as Betty	April 14, 1957
69	30	"The Three Dreams of Mr. Findlater"	Jules Bricken	Story by : A. A. Milne; Teleplay by : Sarett Rudley	John Williams as Ernest Findlater, Barbara Baxley as Lalage	April 21, 1957
70	31	"The Night the World Ended"	Justus Addiss	Story by : Fredric Brown; Teleplay by : Bernard C. Schoenfeld	Russell Collins as Johnny, Harold J. Stone as Halloran	April 28, 1957
71	32	"The Hands of Mr. Ottermole"	Robert Stevens	Story by : Thomas Burke; Teleplay by : Francis Cockrell	Theodore Bikel as Sergeant Ottermole, Rhys Williams as Summers the journalist, Torin Thatcher as Constable Johnson	May 5, 1957
72	33	"A Man Greatly Beloved"	James Neilson	Story by : A. A. Milne; Teleplay by : Sarett Rudley	Sir Cedric Hardwicke as "John Anderson", Evelyn Rudie as Hildegard Fell, Hugh Marlowe as Reverend Richard Fell	May 12, 1957
73	34	"Martha Mason, Movie Star"	Justus Addiss	Story by : Raymond Mason; Teleplay by : Robert C. Dennis	Judith Evelyn as Mabel McKay, Robert Emhardt as Henry G. McKay	May 19, 1957
74	35	"The West Warlock Time Capsule"	Justus Addiss	Story by : J. P. Cahn; Teleplay by : Marian Cockrell	Henry Jones as George Tiffany, Mildred Dunnock as Louise Tiffany	May 26, 1957
75	36	"Father and Son"	Herschel Daugherty	Story by : Thomas Burke; Teleplay by : James Cavanagh	Edmund Gwenn as Joe Saunders	June 2, 1957
76	37	"The Indestructible Mr. Weems"	Justus Addiss	George F. Slavin	Robert Middleton as Brother Cato Stone, Joe Mantell as Brother Harry Brown, Russell Collins as Clarence Weems	June 9, 1957
77	38	"A Little Sleep"	Paul Henreid	Story by : Joe Grenzeback; Teleplay by : Robert C. Dennis	Barbara Cook as Barbie Hallem, Vic Morrow as Benny Mungo	June 16, 1957
78	39	"The Dangerous People"	Robert Stevens	Story by : Fredric Brown; Teleplay by : Francis Cockrell	Albert Salmi as Jones, Robert H. Harris as Bellefontaine	June 23, 1957

== Season 3 (1957–58) ==
No. overall	No. in season	Title	Directed by	Written by	Stars	Original release date
79	1	"The Glass Eye"	Robert Stevens	Story by : John Keir Cross; Teleplay by : Stirling Silliphant	Jessica Tandy as Julia Whitely, Tom Conway as Max Collodi, William Shatner as Jim Whitely	October 6, 1957
80	2	"Mail Order Prophet"	James Neilson	Story by : Antony Ferry; Teleplay by : Robert C. Dennis	E. G. Marshall as Ronald J. Grimes, Jack Klugman as George Benedict	October 13, 1957
81	3	"The Perfect Crime"	Alfred Hitchcock	Story by : Ben Ray Redman; Teleplay by : Stirling Silliphant	Vincent Price as Charles Courtney, James Gregory as John Gregory	October 20, 1957
82	4	"Heart of Gold"	Robert Stevens	Story by : Henry Slesar; Teleplay by : James Cavanagh	Mildred Dunnock as Martha Collins, Darryl Hickman as Jackie Blake, Nehemiah Persoff as Ralph Collins	October 27, 1957
83	5	"Silent Witness"	Paul Henreid	Story by : Jeanne Barry; Teleplay by : Robert C. Dennis	Don Taylor as Donald "Bob" Mason, Dolores Hart as Claudia Powell, Pat Hitchcock as Nancy Mason	November 3, 1957
84	6	"Reward to Finder"	James Neilson	Story by : F.J. Smith; Teleplay by : Frank Gabrielson	Jo Van Fleet as Anna Gaminski, Oskar Homolka as Carl Gaminski	November 10, 1957
85	7	"Enough Rope for Two"	Paul Henreid	Story by : Clark Howard; Teleplay by : Joel Murcott	Jean Hagen as Madge Griffin, Steven Hill as Joe Kedzie, Steve Brodie as Maxie	November 17, 1957
86	8	"Last Request"	Paul Henreid	Story by : Helen Fislar Brooks; Teleplay by : Joel Murcott	Harry Guardino as Gerry Daniels, Cara Williams as Mona Carstairs, Hugh Marlowe as Bernard Butler	November 24, 1957
87	9	"The Young One"	Robert Altman	Story by : Phillip Goodman and Sandy Sax; Teleplay by : Sarett Rudley	Carol Lynley as Janice, Vince Edwards as Tex	December 1, 1957
88	10	"The Diplomatic Corpse"	Paul Henreid	Story by : Alec Coppel; Teleplay by : Robert C. Dennis	Peter Lorre as Detective Thomas Salgado, George Peppard as Evan Wallace, Mary Scott as Janet Wallace	December 8, 1957
89	11	"The Deadly"	Don Taylor	Story by : Lawrence Treat; Teleplay by : Robert C. Dennis	Phyllis Thaxter as Margot Brenner, Lee Phillips as Jack Staley, Craig Stevens as Lee Brenner	December 15, 1957
90	12	"Miss Paisley's Cat"	Justus Addiss	Story by : Roy Vickers; Teleplay by : Marian Cockrell	Dorothy Stickney as Emma Paisley, Orangey as Stanley	December 22, 1957
91	13	"Night of the Execution"	Justus Addiss	Story by : Henry Slesar; Teleplay by : Bernard C. Schoenfeld	Pat Hingle as Warren Selvy, Georgann Johnson as Doreen Selvy	December 29, 1957
92	14	"The Percentage"	James Neilson	Story by : David Alexander; Teleplay by : Bernard C. Schoenfeld	Alex Nicol as Eddie Slovak, Nita Talbot as Louise Williams	January 5, 1958
93	15	"Together"	Robert Altman	Story by : Alec Coppel; Teleplay by : Robert C. Dennis	Joseph Cotten as Tony Gould	January 12, 1958
94	16	"Sylvia"	Herschel Daugherty	Story by : Ira Levin; Teleplay by : James Cavanagh	Ann Todd as Sylvia Leeds Kent, John McIntire as John Leeds	January 19, 1958
95	17	"The Motive"	Robert Stevens	Rose Simon Kohn	Skip Homeier as Tommy Greer, William Redfield as Richard	January 26, 1958
96	18	"Miss Bracegirdle Does Her Duty"	Robert Stevens	Story by : Stacy Aumonier; Teleplay by : Marian Cockrell	Mildred Natwick as Millicent Bracegirdle	February 2, 1958
97	19	"The Equalizer"	James Neilson	Story by : C.B. Gilford; Teleplay by : Robert C. Dennis	Leif Erickson as Wayne Phillips, Martin Balsam as Eldon Marsh, Norma Crane as Louise Marsh	February 9, 1958
98	20	"On the Nose"	James Neilson	Story by : Henry Slesar; Teleplay by : Irving Elman	Jan Sterling as Fran Holland	February 16, 1958
99	21	"Guest for Breakfast"	Paul Henreid	Story by : C.B. Gilford; Teleplay by : Robert C. Dennis	Joan Tetzel as Eve Ross, Scott McKay as Jordan Ross, Richard Shepard as Chester Lacey	February 23, 1958
100	22	"The Return of the Hero"	Herschel Daugherty	Story by : Andrew Solt; Teleplay by : Andrew Solt and Stirling Silliphant	Jacques Bergerac as Sergeant Andre Doniere, Susan Kohner as Therese	March 2, 1958
101	23	"The Right Kind of House"	Don Taylor	Story by : Henry Slesar; Teleplay by : Robert C. Dennis	Robert Emhardt as Mr. Waterbury, Jeanette Nolan as Sadie Grimes	March 9, 1958
102	24	"The Foghorn"	Robert Stevens	Story by : Gertrude Atherton; Teleplay by : Frank Gabrielson	Barbara Bel Geddes as Lucia Clay, Michael Rennie as Allen Bliss	March 16, 1958
103	25	"Flight to the East"	Arthur Hiller	Story by : Bevil Charles; Teleplay by : Joel Murcott	Gary Merrill as Ted Franklin, Patricia Cutts as Barbara Denim	March 23, 1958
104	26	"Bull in a China Shop"	James Neilson	Story by : C.B. Gilford; Teleplay by : Sarett Rudley	Dennis Morgan as Detective Dennis O'Finn, Estelle Winwood as Miss Hildy-Lou	March 30, 1958
105	27	"Disappearing Trick"	Arthur Hiller	Story by : Victor Canning; Teleplay by : Kathleen Hite	Robert Horton as Walter Richmond, Betsy von Furstenberg as Laura Gild	April 6, 1958
106	28	"Lamb to the Slaughter"	Alfred Hitchcock	Roald Dahl	Barbara Bel Geddes as Mary Maloney	April 13, 1958
107	29	"Fatal Figures"	Don Taylor	Story by : Rick Edelstein; Teleplay by : Robert C. Dennis	John McGiver as Harold Goames, Vivian Nathan as Margaret Goames	April 20, 1958
108	30	"Death Sentence"	Paul Henreid	Story by : Miriam Allen deFord; Teleplay by : Joel Murcott	James Best as Norman Frayne, Katharine Bard as Paula Frayne, Steve Brodie as Al Revnel	April 27, 1958
109	31	"The Festive Season"	Arthur Hiller	Story by : Stanley Ellin; Teleplay by : James Cavanaugh	Carmen Mathews as Celia Boerum, Edmon Ryan as Attorney John, Richard Waring as Charlie Boerum	May 4, 1958
110	32	"Listen, Listen...!"	Don Taylor	Story by : R.E. Kendall; Teleplay by : Bernard C. Schoenfeld	Edgar Stehli as Herbert Johnson	May 11, 1958
111	33	"Post Mortem"	Arthur Hiller	Story by : Cornell Woolrich; Teleplay by : Robert C. Dennis	Steve Forrest as Steve Archer, Joanna Moore as Judy Archer, James Gregory as Wescott	May 18, 1958
112	34	"The Crocodile Case"	Don Taylor	Story by : Roy Vickers; Teleplay by : Robert C. Dennis	Denholm Elliott as Jack Lyons, Hazel Court as Phyllis Chaundry-Lyons	May 25, 1958
113	35	"Dip in the Pool"	Alfred Hitchcock	Roald Dahl	Keenan Wynn as William Botibol, Doreen Lang as Emily	June 1, 1958
114	36	"The Safe Place"	James Neilson	Story by : Jay Wilson; Teleplay by : Michael Hogan	Robert H. Harris as George Piper, Joanne Linville as Millie Manners	June 8, 1958
115	37	"The Canary Sedan"	Robert Stevens	Story by : Ann Bridge; Teleplay by : Stirling Silliphant	Jessica Tandy as Laura Bowlby, Murray Matheson as James St. George Bernard Bowlby	June 15, 1958
116	38	"The Impromptu Murder"	Paul Henreid	Story by : Roy Vickers; Teleplay by : Francis Cockrell	Hume Cronyn as Henry Daw, Robert Douglas as Inspector Charles Tarrant	June 22, 1958
117	39	"Little White Frock"	Herschel Daugherty	Story by : Stacy Aumonier; Teleplay by : Stirling Silliphant	Herbert Marshall as Colin Bragner, Julie Adams as Carol Longsworth, Tom Helmore as Adam Longsworth	June 29, 1958

== Season 4 (1958–59) ==
No. overall	No. in season	Title	Directed by	Written by	Stars	Original release date
118	1	"Poison"	Alfred Hitchcock	Story by : Roald Dahl; Teleplay by : Casey Robinson	Wendell Corey as Timber Woods, James Donald as Harry Pope	October 5, 1958
119	2	"Don't Interrupt"	Robert Stevens	Sidney Carroll	Chill Wills as Mr. Kilmer, Cloris Leachman as Mary Templeton, Biff McGuire as Larry Templeton, Peter Lazer as Johnny Templeton, Scatman Crothers as Timothy	October 12, 1958
120	3	"The Jokester"	Arthur Hiller	Story by : Robert Arthur; Teleplay by : Bernard C. Schoenfeld	Albert Salmi as Bradley the Reporter, Roscoe Ates as Pop Henderson, James Coburn as Andrews the Reporter	October 19, 1958
121	4	"The Crooked Road"	Paul Henreid	Story by : Alex Gaby; Teleplay by : William Fay	Richard Kiley as Harry Adams, Walter Matthau as Officer Pete Chandler, Patricia Breslin as Mrs. Adams	October 26, 1958
122	5	"The $2,000,000 Defense"	Norman Lloyd	Story by : Harold Q. Masur; Teleplay by : William Fay	Barry Sullivan as Mark Robeson, Leslie Nielsen as Lloyd Ashley, Herbert Anderson as John Keller	November 2, 1958
123	6	"Design for Loving"	Robert Stevens	Ray Bradbury	Norman Lloyd as Charles Brailing / Robot, Marian Seldes as Lydia Brailing, Elliott Reid as Tom Smith, Barbara Baxley as Anne Smith	November 9, 1958
124	7	"Man with a Problem"	Robert Stevens	Story by : Donald Martin; Teleplay by : Joel Murcott	Gary Merrill as Carl Adams, Mark Richman as Officer Steve Barrett, Elizabeth Montgomery as Karen Adams	November 16, 1958
125	8	"Safety for the Witness"	Norman Lloyd	Story by : John De Meyer; Teleplay by : William Fay	Art Carney as Cyril T. Jones	November 23, 1958
126	9	"Murder Me Twice"	David Swift	Story by : Lawrence Treat; Teleplay by : Irving Elman	Phyllis Thaxter as Lucy Pryor, Tom Helmore as Miles Farnham	December 7, 1958
127	10	"Tea Time"	Robert Stevens	Story by : Margaret Manners; Teleplay by : Kathleen Hite	Margaret Leighton as Iris Teleton, Marsha Hunt as Blanche Herbert, Murray Matheson as Oliver Teleton	December 14, 1958
128	11	"And the Desert Shall Blossom"	Arthur Hiller	Story by : Loren D. Good; Teleplay by : Bernard C. Schoenfeld	William Demarest as Tom Akins, Roscoe Ates as Ben White, Ben Johnson as Sheriff Jeff	December 21, 1958
129	12	"Mrs. Herman and Mrs. Fenimore"	Arthur Hiller	Story by : Donald Honig; Teleplay by : Robert C. Dennis	Mary Astor as Mrs. Fenimore, Russell Collins as Bill Finley, Doro Merande as Mrs. Herman	December 28, 1958
130	13	"Six People, No Music"	Norman Lloyd	Story by : Garson Kanin; Teleplay by : Richard Berg	John McGiver as Arthur Motherwell, Peggy Cass as Rhoda Motherwell	January 4, 1959
131	14	"The Morning After"	Herschel Daugherty	Story by : Henry Slesar; Teleplay by : Rose Simon Kohn	Robert Alda as Ben Nelson, Jeanette Nolan as Mrs. Trotter, Dorothy Provine as Sharon Trotter, Fay Wray as Mrs. Nelson	January 11, 1959
132	15	"A Personal Matter"	Paul Henreid	Story by : Brett Halliday; Teleplay by : Joel Murcott	Wayne Morris as Bret Johnson, Joe Maross as Joe Philips	January 18, 1959
133	16	"Out There – Darkness"	Paul Henreid	Story by : William O'Farrell; Teleplay by : Bernard C. Schoenfeld	Bette Davis as Miss Fox	January 25, 1959
134	17	"Total Loss"	Don Taylor	J.E. Selby	Nancy Olson as Jan Manning, Ralph Meeker as Mel Reeves	February 1, 1959
135	18	"The Last Dark Step"	Herschel Daugherty	Story by : Margaret Manners; Teleplay by : William Fay	Robert Horton as Brad Taylor, Fay Spain as Leslie Lenox	February 8, 1959
136	19	"The Morning of the Bride"	Arthur Hiller	Story by : Neil S. Broadman; Teleplay by : Kathleen Hite	Barbara Bel Geddes as Helen Brewster, Don Dubbins as Philip Pryor	February 15, 1959
137	20	"The Diamond Necklace"	Herschel Daugherty	Sarett Rudley	Claude Rains as Andrew Thurgood, Betsy von Furstenberg as Thelma Thurgood	February 22, 1959
138	21	"Relative Value"	Paul Almond	Story by : Milward Kennedy; Teleplay by : Frances Cockrell	Denholm Elliott as John Manbridge, Torin Thatcher as Felix Edward Manbridge	March 1, 1959
139	22	"The Right Price"	Arthur Hiller	Story by : Henry Slesar; Teleplay by : Bernard C. Schoenfeld	Eddie Foy Jr. as "the Cat", Allyn Joslyn as Mort Barnhardt	March 8, 1959
140	23	"I'll Take Care of You"	Robert Stevens	Story by : George Johnson; Teleplay by : William Fay	Ralph Meeker as John Forbes, Russell Collins as "Dad", Elisabeth Fraser as Dorothy Forbes	March 15, 1959
141	24	"The Avon Emeralds"	Bretaigne Windust	Story by : Joe Pidcock; Teleplay by : William Fay	Roger Moore as Inspector Benson, Hazel Court as Lady Gwendolyn Avon, Alan Napier as Sir Charles Harrington	March 22, 1959
142	25	"The Kind Waitress"	Paul Henreid	Henry Slesar	Olive Deering as Thelma Tompkins, Celia Lovsky as Sara Mannerheim, Rick Jason as Arthur	March 29, 1959
143	26	"Cheap Is Cheap"	Bretaigne Windust	Albert E. Lewin and Burt Styler	Dennis Day as Alexander Gifford	April 5, 1959
144	27	"The Waxwork"	Robert Stevens	Story by : A. M. Burrage; Teleplay by : Casey Robinson	Barry Nelson as Raymond Houston, Everett Sloane as Mr. Marriner	April 12, 1959
145	28	"The Impossible Dream"	Robert Stevens	John Lindsey	Franchot Tone as Oliver Mathews, Carmen Mathews as Miss Hall, Mary Astor as Grace Dolan	April 19, 1959
146	29	"Banquo's Chair"	Alfred Hitchcock	Story by : Rupert Croft-Cooke; Teleplay by : Francis Cockrell	John Williams Inspector Brent, Kenneth Haigh as John Bedford, Reginald Gardiner as Major Cook-Finch	May 3, 1959
147	30	"A Night with the Boys"	John Brahm	Story by : Henry Slesar and Jay Fob; Teleplay by : Bernard C. Schoenfeld	John Smith as Irving Randall, Joyce Meadows as Frances Randall	May 10, 1959
148	31	"Your Witness"	Norman Lloyd	Story by : Helen Nielsen; Teleplay by : William Fay	Brian Keith as Arnold Shawn, Leora Dana as Naomi Shawn	May 17, 1959
149	32	"Human Interest Story"	Norman Lloyd	Fredric Brown "The Last Martian"	Steve McQueen as Bill Everett, Arthur Hill as Yangan Dall / 'Howard Wilcox', Clint Eastwood as Newsman (uncredited),	May 24, 1959
150	33	"The Dusty Drawer"	Herschel Daugherty	Story by : Harry Muheim; Teleplay by : Halstead Welles	Dick York as Norman Logan	May 31, 1959
151	34	"A True Account" "Curtains for Me"	Leonard Horn	Rupert Croft-Cooke	Jane Greer as Mrs. Cannon-Hughes / Ms. Cannon-Hughes / Mrs. Cannon-Hughes-Brett, Kent Smith as Gilbert Hughes, Robert Webber as Paul Brett, Jocelyn Brando as Alice	June 7, 1959
152	35	"Touché"	John Brahm	Story by : Bryce Walton; Teleplay by : William Fay	Paul Douglas as Bill Fleming, Robert Morse as Phil (Phillip Baxter, Jr.)	June 14, 1959
153	36	"Invitation to an Accident"	Don Taylor	Wade Miller	Gary Merrill as Joseph Pond, Joanna Moore as Virginia Pond	June 21, 1959

== Season 5 (1959–60) ==
No. overall	No. in season	Title	Directed by	Written by	Stars	Original release date
154	1	"Arthur"	Alfred Hitchcock	Story by : Arthur Williams; Teleplay by : James Cavanagh	Laurence Harvey as Arthur Williams, Hazel Court as Helen Braithwaite, Patrick Macnee as Sergeant John Theron	September 27, 1959
155	2	"The Crystal Trench"	Alfred Hitchcock	Story by : A. E. W. Mason; Teleplay by : Stirling Silliphant	James Donald as Mark Cavendish, Patricia Owens as Stella Ballister	October 4, 1959
156	3	"Appointment at Eleven"	Robert Stevens	Story by : Robert Turner; Teleplay by : Evan Hunter	Clint Kimbrough as David 'Davie' Logan, Norma Crane as the Blonde Lady in Bar, Clu Gulager as the Sailor, Sean McClory as the Irish Bar Patron	October 11, 1959
157	4	"Coyote Moon"	Herschel Daugherty	Story by : Kenneth B. Perkins; Teleplay by : Harold Swanton	Macdonald Carey as the Professor, Collin Wilcox as Julie, Edgar Buchanan as Pops	October 18, 1959
158	5	"No Pain"	Norman Lloyd	Story by : Talmage Powell; Teleplay by : William Fay	Brian Keith as Dave Rainey, Joanna Moore as Cindy Rainey	October 25, 1959
159	6	"Anniversary Gift"	Norman Lloyd	Story by : John Collier; Teleplay by : Harold Swanton	Harry Morgan as Hermie Jenkins, Barbara Baxley as Myra Jenkins, Jackie Coogan as George Bay	November 1, 1959
160	7	"Dry Run"	John Brahm	Story by : Norman Struber; Teleplay by : Bill S. Ballinger	Walter Matthau as Moran, Robert Vaughn as Art, David White as Barberosa	November 8, 1959
161	8	"The Blessington Method"	Herschel Daugherty	Story by : Stanley Ellin; Teleplay by : Halsted Welles	Henry Jones as John Treadwell, Dick York as J.J. Bunce	November 15, 1959
162	9	"Dead Weight"	Stuart Rosenberg	Story by : Herb Golden; Teleplay by : Jerry Sohl	Joseph Cotten as Courtney Nesbitt Masterson, Julie Adams as Peg Valence, Don Gordon as Rudy Stickney, the Thug	November 22, 1959
163	10	"Special Delivery"	Norman Lloyd	Ray Bradbury	Steve Dunne as Bill Fortnam, Beatrice Straight as Cynthia Fortnam	November 29, 1959
164	11	"Road Hog"	Stuart Rosenberg	Story by : Harold Daniels; Teleplay by : Bill S. Ballinger	Raymond Massey as Sam Pine, Robert Emhardt as Ed Fratus, Richard Chamberlain as Clay Pine	December 6, 1959
165	12	"Specialty of the House"	Robert Stevens	Story by : Stanley Ellin; Teleplay by : Victor Wolfson & Bernard C. Schoenfeld	Robert Morley as Mr. Laffler, Kenneth Haigh as Mr. Costain, Spivy as Spirro	December 13, 1959
166	13	"An Occurrence at Owl Creek Bridge"	Robert Stevenson	Story by : Ambrose Bierce; Teleplay by : Harold Swanton	Ronald Howard as Peyton Farquhar, Juano Hernandez as Josh, James Coburn as Union Sergeant	December 20, 1959
167	14	"Graduating Class"	Herschel Daugherty	Story by : Edouard Sandoz; Teleplay by : Stirling Silliphant	Wendy Hiller as Laura Siddons, Gigi Perreau as Gloria Barnes, Jocelyn Brando as Vice Principal Julia Conrad	December 27, 1959
168	15	"Man from the South"	Norman Lloyd	Story by : Roald Dahl; Teleplay by : William Fay	Steve McQueen as the Gambler, Peter Lorre as Carlos, Neile Adams as the Woman	January 3, 1960
169	16	"The Ikon of Elijah"	Paul Almond	Story by : Avram Davidson; Teleplay by : Norah Perez & Victor Wolfson	Oskar Homolka as Carpius, Sam Jaffe as the Abbot	January 10, 1960
170	17	"The Cure"	Herschel Daugherty	Story by : Robert Bloch; Teleplay by : Michael Pertwee	Nehemiah Persoff as Jeff Jensen, Mark Richman as Mike, Cara Williams as Marie Jensen	January 24, 1960
171	18	"Backward, Turn Backward"	Stuart Rosenberg	Story by : Dorothy Salisbury Davis; Teleplay by : Charles Beaumont	Tom Tully as Phil Canby, Phyllis Love as Sue Thompson, Alan Baxter as Sheriff Andy Willetts	January 31, 1960
172	19	"Not the Running Type"	Arthur Hiller	Story by : Henry Slesar; Teleplay by : Jerry Sohl	Paul Hartman as Milton Potter, Robert Bray as Sergeant/Captain Ernest Fisher	February 7, 1960
173	20	"The Day of the Bullet"	Norman Lloyd	Story by : Stanley Ellin; Teleplay by : Bill S. Ballinger	Barry Gordon as Ignace 'Iggy' Kovacs, Glenn Walken as Young Clete Vine	February 14, 1960
174	21	"Hitch Hike"	Paul Henreid	Story by : Ed Lacy; Teleplay by : Bernard C. Schoenfeld	John McIntire as Charles Underhill, Robert Morse as Len, Suzanne Pleshette as Anne Underhill	February 21, 1960
175	22	"Across the Threshold"	Arthur Hiller	Story by : L. B. Gordon; Teleplay by : Charlotte Armstrong	Patricia Collinge as Sofie Winter, George Grizzard as Hubert Winter, Barbara Baxley as Irma Coulette	February 28, 1960
176	23	"Craig's Will"	Gene Reynolds	Story by : Valerie Dyke; Teleplay by : Burt Styler & Albert E. Lewin	Dick Van Dyke as Thomas Craig, Stella Stevens as Judy, Paul Stewart as Vincent Noonan	March 6, 1960
177	24	"Madame Mystery"	John Brahm	Story by : Robert Bloch; Teleplay by : William Fay	Audrey Totter as Betsy Blake, Joby Baker as Jimmy Dolan	March 27, 1960
178	25	"The Little Man Who Was There"	George Stevens, Jr.	Gordon Russell & Larry Ward	Norman Lloyd as the Little Man, Arch Johnson as Jaime McMahon, Read Morgan as Ben McMahon	April 3, 1960
179	26	"Mother, May I Go Out to Swim?"	Herschel Daugherty	Story by : Q. Patrick; Teleplay by : James Cavanagh	William Shatner as John Crane, Jessie Royce Landis as Claire Crane, Gia Scala as Lottie Rank	April 10, 1960
180	27	"The Cuckoo Clock"	John Brahm	Story by : Frank Mace; Teleplay by : Robert Bloch	Beatrice Straight as Ida Blythe, Fay Spain as Madeleine Hall, Donald Buka as the Mental Patient at the door	April 17, 1960
181	28	"Forty Detectives Later"	Arthur Hiller	Henry Slesar	James Franciscus as William Tyre, Jack Weston as Otto	April 24, 1960
182	29	"The Hero"	John Brahm	Story by : Henry De Vere Stacpoole; Teleplay by : Bill S. Ballinger	Eric Portman as Sir Richard Musgrave, Oskar Homolka as Jan Vander Klaue / Mr. A.J. Keyser	May 1, 1960
183	30	"Insomnia"	John Brahm	Henry Slesar	Dennis Weaver as Charles 'Charlie' Morton Cavender	May 8, 1960
184	31	"I Can Take Care of Myself"	Alan Crosland, Jr.	Story by : Fred McMorrow; Teleplay by : Thomas Grant	Myron McCormick as Bert Haber, Linda Lawson as Georgia	May 15, 1960
185	32	"One Grave Too Many"	Arthur Hiller	Story by : Henry Slesar; Teleplay by : Eli Jerome	Neile Adams as Irene Helmer, Jeremy Slate as Joe Helmer, Biff Elliot as Lieutenant Bates, Howard McNear as Mr. Pickett	May 22, 1960
186	33	"Party Line"	Hilton A. Green	Story by : Henry Slesar; Teleplay by : Eli Jerome	Judy Canova as Helen Parch, Royal Dano as Mr. Atkins, Arch Johnson as Heywood Miller	May 29, 1960
187	34	"Cell 227"	Paul Henreid	Story by : Bryce Walton; Teleplay by : Bill S. Ballinger	Brian Keith as Herbert 'Herbie' Morrison, James Best as Hennessy	June 5, 1960
188	35	"The Schartz-Metterklume Method"	Richard Dunlap	Story by : Saki; Teleplay by : Marian Cockrell	Hermione Gingold as "Miss Hope" / Lady Charlotte	June 12, 1960
189	36	"Letter of Credit"	Paul Henreid	Helen Nielsen	Bob Sweeney as William Spengler, Robert Bray as Henry Taylor Lowden	June 19, 1960
190	37	"Escape to Sonoita"	Stuart Rosenberg	Story by : James A. Howard; Teleplay by : James A. Howard & Bill S. Ballinger	Burt Reynolds as Bill Davis, Murray Hamilton as Marsh, Harry Dean Stanton as Lemon, James Bell as Andy Davis	June 26, 1960
191	38	"Hooked"	Norman Lloyd	Story by : Robert Turner; Teleplay by : Thomas Grant	Robert Horton as Ray Marchand, Vivienne Segal as Gladys, Anne Francis as Nyla Foster	September 25, 1960

== Season 6 (1960–61) ==
No. overall	No. in season	Title	Directed by	Written by	Stars	Original release date
192	1	"Mrs. Bixby and the Colonel's Coat"	Alfred Hitchcock	Story by : Roald Dahl; Teleplay by : Halsted Welles	Audrey Meadows as Mrs. Bixby, Les Tremayne as Dr. Fred Bixby	September 27, 1960
193	2	"The Doubtful Doctor"	Arthur Hiller	Story by : Louis Paul; Teleplay by : Jerry Sohl	Dick York as Ralph Jones, Gena Rowlands as Lucille Jones	October 4, 1960
194	3	"Very Moral Theft"	Norman Lloyd	Story by : Jack Dillon; Teleplay by : Allan Gordon	Betty Field as Helen, Walter Matthau as Harry Wade	October 11, 1960
195	4	"The Contest for Aaron Gold"	Norman Lloyd	Story by : Philip Roth; Teleplay by : William Fay	Barry Gordon as Aaron Gold, Sydney Pollack as Bernie Samuelson, Frank Maxwell as Mr. Lyle Stern	October 18, 1960
196	5	"The Five-Forty-Eight"	John Brahm	Story by : John Cheever; Teleplay by : Charlotte Armstrong	Phyllis Thaxter as Miss Dent, Zachary Scott as Mr. Blake	October 25, 1960
197	6	"Pen Pal"	John Brahm	Story by : Henry Slesar & Jay Folb; Teleplay by : Hilary Murray	Katherine Squire as Miss Lowen, Clu Gulager as Rod Collins	November 1, 1960
198	7	"Outlaw in Town"	Herschel Daugherty	Michael Fessier	Ricardo Montalbán as "Tony" Lorca / Pepe Lorca, Constance Ford as Shasta Cooney	November 15, 1960
199	8	"O Youth and Beauty!"	Norman Lloyd	Story by : John Cheever; Teleplay by : Halsted Welles	Gary Merrill as Cash Bentley, Patricia Breslin as Louise Bentley	November 22, 1960
200	9	"The Money"	Alan Crosland, Jr.	Henry Slesar	Robert Loggia as Larry Chetnik, Doris Dowling as Angie, Will Kuluva as Stefan Bregornick	November 29, 1960
201	10	"Sybilla"	Ida Lupino	Story by : Margaret Manners; Teleplay by : Charlotte Armstrong	Barbara Bel Geddes as Sybilla Meade, Alexander Scourby as Horace Meade	December 6, 1960
202	11	"The Man with Two Faces"	Stuart Rosenberg	Henry Slesar	Spring Byington as Alice Wagner, Steve Dunne as Lieutenant Meade, Bethel Leslie as Mabel Graves	December 13, 1960
203	12	"The Baby-Blue Expression"	Arthur Hiller	Story by : Mary Stolz; Teleplay by : Helen Nielsen	Sarah Marshall as Mrs. Barrett	December 20, 1960
204	13	"The Man Who Found the Money"	Alan Crosland, Jr.	Story by : James E. Cronin; Teleplay by : Allan Gordon	Arthur Hill as William Benson	December 27, 1960
205	14	"The Changing Heart"	Robert Florey	Robert Bloch	Nicholas Pryor as Dane Rosse, Anne Helm as Lisa Klemm, Abraham Sofaer as Ulrich Klemm	January 3, 1961
206	15	"Summer Shade"	Herschel Daugherty	Story by : Nora H. Caplan; Teleplay by : Harold Swanton	Julie Adams as Phyllis Kendall, James Franciscus as Ben Kendall	January 10, 1961
207	16	"A Crime for Mothers"	Ida Lupino	Henry Slesar	Claire Trevor as Mrs. Meade, Biff Elliot as Phil Ames	January 24, 1961
208	17	"The Last Escape"	Paul Henreid	Henry Slesar	Keenan Wynn as Joe Ferlini, Jan Sterling as Wanda Ferlini	January 31, 1961
209	18	"The Greatest Monster of Them All"	Robert Stevens	Story by : Bryce Walton; Teleplay by : Robert Bloch	William Redfield as Fred Logan, Richard Hale as Ernst von Croft, Sam Jaffe as Hal Ballew, Robert H. Harris as Morty Lenton	February 14, 1961
210	19	"The Landlady"	Paul Henreid	Story by : Roald Dahl; Teleplay by : Robert Bloch	Dean Stockwell as Billy Weaver, Patricia Collinge as the Landlady	February 21, 1961
211	20	"The Throwback"	John Brahm	Henry Slesar	Scott Marlowe as Eliot Gray, Murray Matheson as Cyril Hardeen, Joyce Meadows as Enid	February 28, 1961
212	21	"The Kiss-Off"	Alan Crosland, Jr.	Story by : John P. Foran; Teleplay by : Talmage Powell	Rip Torn as Ernie Walters	March 7, 1961
213	22	"The Horseplayer"	Alfred Hitchcock	Henry Slesar	Claude Rains as Father Amion, Ed Gardner as Sheridan	March 14, 1961
214	23	"Incident in a Small Jail"	Norman Lloyd	Henry Slesar	John Fiedler as Leon Gorwald, Richard Jaeckel as the Suspect / Mechanic, Ron Nicholas as Deputy Bill 'Sandy' Sanderson	March 21, 1961
215	24	"A Woman's Help"	Arthur Hiller	Henry Slesar	Geraldine Fitzgerald as Elizabeth Burton, Scott McKay as Arnold Burton, Antoinette Bower as Miss Greco	March 28, 1961
216	25	"Museum Piece"	Paul Henreid	Story by : William C. Morrison; Teleplay by : Harold Swanton	Larry Gates as Mr. Hollister, Myron McCormick as Newton B. Clovis	April 4, 1961
217	26	"Coming, Mama"	George Stevens, Jr.	Story by : Henriette McClelland; Teleplay by : James Cavanagh	Eileen Heckart as Lucy Baldwin, Don DeFore as Arthur Clark	April 11, 1961
218	27	"Deathmate"	Alan Crosland, Jr.	Story by : James Causey; Teleplay by : Bill S. Ballinger	Lee Philips as Ben Conan / Fred Sheldon, Gia Scala as Lisa Talbot, Russell Collins as Alvin Moss	April 18, 1961
219	28	"Gratitude"	Alan Crosland, Jr.	Story by : Donne Byrne; Teleplay by : William Fay	Peter Falk as Meyer Fine, Paul Hartman as John	April 25, 1961
220	29	"The Pearl Necklace"	Don Weis	Peggy and Lou Shaw	Hazel Court as Charlotte Jameson Rutherford, Ernest Truex as Howard Rutherford, Jack Cassidy as Mark Lansing	May 2, 1961
221	30	"You Can't Trust a Man"	Paul Henreid	Helen Nielsen	Polly Bergen as Crystal Coe, Joe Maross as Tony Coe	May 9, 1961
222	31	"The Gloating Place"	Alan Crosland, Jr.	Robert Bloch	Susan Harrison as Susan Harper, Hank Brandt (credited as Henry Brandt) as the Police Detective	May 16, 1961
223	32	"Self Defense"	Paul Henreid	John T. Kelley	George Nader as Gerald R. Clarke, Audrey Totter as Mrs. Philips	May 23, 1961
224	33	"A Secret Life"	Don Weis	Story by : Nicholas Monsarrat; Teleplay by : Jerry Sohl	Ronald Howard as James Howgill, Mary Murphy as Estelle, Patricia Donahue as Marjorie Howgill	May 31, 1961
225	34	"Servant Problem"	Alan Crosland, Jr.	Henry Slesar	Jo Van Fleet as Molly Drake, John Emery as Kerwin Drake / Merwin	June 6, 1961
226	35	"Coming Home"	Alf Kjellin	Henry Slesar	Crahan Denton as Harry Beggs, Jeanette Nolan as Edith Beggs	June 13, 1961
227	36	"Final Arrangements"	Gordon Hessler	Story by : Lawrence A. Page; Teleplay by : Robert Arthur	Martin Balsam as Leonard Thompson, Vivian Nathan as Elise 'Elsie' Thompson, Slim Pickens as Bradshaw	June 20, 1961
228	37	"Make My Death Bed"	Arthur Hiller	Story by : Babs H. Deal; Teleplay by : Henry A. Cogge	Diana Van der Vlis as Elise Taylor, James Best as Bish Darby	June 27, 1961
229	38	"Ambition"	Paul Henreid	Story by : Charles Boeckman; Teleplay by : Joel Murcott	Leslie Nielsen as District Attorney Rudy Cox, Harold J. Stone as Mac Davis	July 4, 1961

== Season 7 (1961–62) ==
No. overall	No. in season	Title	Directed by	Written by	Stars	Original release date
230	1	"The Hatbox"	Alan Crosland, Jr.	Henry Slesar	Paul Ford as Professor Jarvis, Billy Gray as Perry Hatch	October 10, 1961
231	2	"Bang! You're Dead"	Alfred Hitchcock	Story by : Margery Vosper; Teleplay by : Harold Swanton	Bill Mumy as Jackie Chester	October 17, 1961
232	3	"Maria"	Boris Sagal	Story by : John Wyndham; Teleplay by : John Collier	Nita Talbot as Carol Torbey, Norman Lloyd as Leo Torbey	October 24, 1961
233	4	"Cop for a Day"	Paul Henreid	Henry Slesar	Walter Matthau as Phil	October 31, 1961
234	5	"Keep Me Company"	Alan Crosland, Jr.	Henry Slesar	Anne Francis as Julia Reddy	November 7, 1961
235	6	"Beta Delta Gamma"	Alan Crosland, Jr.	Calvin Clements	Burt Brinckerhoff as Alan, Barbara Steele as Phyllis	November 14, 1961
236	7	"You Can't Be a Little Girl All Your Life"	Norman Lloyd	Story by : Stanley Ellin; Teleplay by : Helen Nielsen	Dick York as Tom Barton	November 21, 1961
237	8	"The Old Pro"	Paul Henreid	Story by : H. A. De Rosso; Teleplay by : Calvin Clements	Richard Conte as Frank Burns, Sara Shane as Loretta Burns	November 28, 1961
238	9	"I Spy"	Norman Lloyd	Story by : John Mortimer; Teleplay by : John Collier	Kay Walsh as Mrs. Morgan, Eric Barker as Mr. Frute	December 5, 1961
239	10	"Services Rendered"	Paul Henreid	Richard Levinson & William Link	Steve Dunne as the Young Amnesiac	December 12, 1961
240	11	"The Right Kind of Medicine"	Alan Crosland, Jr.	Henry Slesar	Robert Redford as Charlie Marx (credited as Charlie Pugh in end credits), Joby Baker as Vernon	December 19, 1961
241	12	"A Jury of Her Peers"	Robert Florey	Story by : Susan Glaspell; Teleplay by : James Cavanagh	Ann Harding as Sarah Hale, June Walker as Millie Wright	December 26, 1961
242	13	"The Silk Petticoat"	John Newland	Story by : Joseph Shearing; Teleplay by : Halsted Welles & Norman Ginsbury	Michael Rennie as Sir Humphrey J. Orford, Antoinette Bower as Elisa Minden-Orford	January 2, 1962
243	14	"Bad Actor"	John Newland	Story by : Max Franklin; Teleplay by : Robert Bloch	Robert Duvall as Bart Conway, Charles Robinson as Jerry Lane, William Schallert as Lieutenant Gunderson	January 9, 1962
244	15	"The Door Without a Key"	Herschel Daugherty	Story by : Norman Daniels; Teleplay by : Irving Elman	Claude Rains as Leonard Eldridge, Bill Mumy as Mickey Hollins	January 16, 1962
245	16	"The Case of M.J.H."	Alan Crosland, Jr.	Henry Slesar	Barbara Baxley as Maude Sheridan, Robert Loggia as James 'Jimmy' French	January 23, 1962
246	17	"The Faith of Aaron Menefee"	Norman Lloyd	Story by : Stanley Ellin; Teleplay by : Ray Bradbury	Andrew Prine as Aaron Menefee, Sidney Blackmer as Reverend Otis Jones	January 30, 1962
247	18	"The Woman Who Wanted to Live"	Alan Crosland, Jr.	Bryce Walton	Charles Bronson as Ray Bardon, Lola Albright as Lisa	February 6, 1962
248	19	"Strange Miracle"	Norman Lloyd	Story by : George Langelaan; Teleplay by : Halsted Welles	David Opatoshu as Pedro Siqueras, Míriam Colón as Lolla Siqueras	February 13, 1962
249	20	"The Test"	Boris Sagal	Henry Slesar	Brian Keith as Vernon Wedge, Eduardo Ciannelli as Mr. Marino	February 20, 1962
250	21	"Burglar Proof"	John Newland	Henry Slesar	Robert Webber as Harrison Fell, Paul Hartman as Sammy Morrisey	February 27, 1962
251	22	"The Big Score"	Boris Sagal	Story by : Sam Merwin, Jr. Teleplay by : Bryce Walton	Evans Evans as Dora, Phillip Reed as Mr. F. Hubert Fellowes, Joseph Trapaso as Murphy	March 6, 1962
252	23	"Profit-Sharing Plan"	Bernard Girard	Richard Levinson & William Link	Henry Jones as Miles Cheever	March 13, 1962
253	24	"Apex"	Alan Crosland, Jr.	Story by : James Workman; Teleplay by : John T. Kelley	Patricia Breslin as Margo, Mark Miller as Claude Shorup, Vivienne Segal as Clara Shorup	March 20, 1962
254	25	"The Last Remains"	Leonard Horn	Henry Slesar	Ed Gardner as Marvin Foley, John Fiedler as Amos Duff	March 27, 1962
255	26	"Ten O'Clock Tiger"	Bernard Girard	William Fay	Frankie Darro as Boots Murphy, Robert Keith as Arthur 'The Professor' Duffy	April 3, 1962
256	27	"Act of Faith"	Bernard Girard	Story by : Eric Ambler; Teleplay by : Nicholas Monsarrat	George Grizzard as Alan Chatterton, Dennis King as Mr. Ralston Temple	April 10, 1962
257	28	"The Kerry Blue"	Paul Henreid	Henry Slesar	Carmen Mathews as Thelma Malley, Gene Evans as Ned Malley	April 17, 1962
258	29	"The Matched Pearl"	Bernard Girard	Henry Slesar	John Ireland as Captain Randolph McCabe, Ernest Truex as Hubert Wilkens	April 24, 1962
259	30	"What Frightened You, Fred?"	Paul Henreid	Story by : Jack Ritchie; Teleplay by : Joel Murcott	Edward Asner as Warden Bragan, R. G. Armstrong as Fred Riordan	May 1, 1962
260	31	"Most Likely to Succeed"	Richard Whorf	Henry Slesar	Joanna Moore as Louise Towers, Jack Carter as Stanley Towers, Howard Morris as Dave Sumner	May 8, 1962
261	32	"Victim Four"	Paul Henreid	Talmage Powell	Peggy Ann Garner as Madeline Drake, John Lupton as Ralph Morrow	May 15, 1962
262	33	"The Opportunity"	Robert Florey	Story by : J.W. Aaron; Teleplay by : Bryce Walton & Henry Slesar	Richard Long as Paul Devore, Coleen Gray as Mrs. Lois Callen	May 22, 1962
263	34	"The Twelve Hour Caper"	John Newland	Story by : Mike Marmer; Teleplay by : Harold Swanton	Dick York as Herbert J. Wiggam	May 29, 1962
264	35	"The Children of Alda Nuova"	Robert Florey	Robert Wallsten	Jack Carson as Frankie Fane, Christopher Dark as Ainsley Crowder	June 5, 1962
265	36	"First Class Honeymoon"	Don Weis	Henry Slesar	Robert Webber as Edward Gibson, Jeremy Slate as Carl Seabrook	June 12, 1962
266	37	"The Big Kick"	Alan Crosland, Jr.	Robert Bloch	Anne Helm as Judy, Wayne Rogers as Kenneth	June 19, 1962
267	38	"Where Beauty Lies"	Robert Florey	Story by : Henry Farrell; Teleplay by : James P. Cavanagh	Cloris Leachman as Caroline Hardy, George Nader as Collin Hardy	June 26, 1962
268	39	"The Sorcerer's Apprentice"	Joseph Lejtes	Robert Bloch	Brandon deWilde as Hugo, Diana Dors as Irene Sadini	Unaired in network run

== Season 8 (1962–63) ==
No. overall	No. in season	Title	Directed by	Written by	Stars	Original release date
269	1	"A Piece of the Action"	Bernard Girard	Alfred Hayes	Gig Young as John 'Jack' 'Duke' Marsden, Robert Redford as Chuck Marsden, Martha Hyer as Alice Marsden, Gene Evans as Ed Krutcher	September 20, 1962
270	2	"Don't Look Behind You"	John Brahm	Barre Lyndon	Vera Miles as Daphne, Jeffrey Hunter as Harold, Dick Sargent as Dave Fulton	September 27, 1962
271	3	"Night of the Owl"	Alan Crosland, Jr.	Andrew Garve	Brian Keith as District Forest Ranger James 'Jim' Mallory, Patricia Breslin as Linda Mallory	October 4, 1962
272	4	"I Saw the Whole Thing"	Alfred Hitchcock	Henry Cecil (story); Henry Slesar (teleplay)	John Forsythe as Michael Barnes, Evans Evans as Penelope 'Penny' Sanford	October 11, 1962
273	5	"Captive Audience"	Alf Kjellin	John Bingham (novel); Richard Levinson, William Link (teleplay)	James Mason as Warren Barrow, Angie Dickinson as Janet West / Janet Waverly	October 18, 1962
274	6	"Final Vow"	Norman Lloyd	Henry Slesar	Carol Lynley as Sister Pamela Wiley, Clu Gulager as Jimmy K. Bresson, R.G. Armstrong as William Downey	October 25, 1962
275	7	"Annabel"	Paul Henreid	Robert Bloch (teleplay); Patricia Highsmith (novel)	Dean Stockwell as David H. Kelsey / William Newmaster, Susan Oliver as Annabel Delaney	November 1, 1962
276	8	"House Guest"	Alan Crosland, Jr.	Andrew Garve	Macdonald Carey as John Mitchell, Robert Sterling as Ray Roscoe	November 8, 1962
277	9	"The Black Curtain"	Sydney Pollack	Cornell Woolrich (novel)	Richard Basehart as Phillip Townsend / David Webber, Lola Albright as Ruth Burke	November 15, 1962
278	10	"Day of Reckoning"	Jerry Hopper	Richard Levinson, William Link	Barry Sullivan as Paul Sampson, Claude Akins as Sheriff Jordan	November 22, 1962
279	11	"Ride the Nightmare"	Bernard Girard	Richard Matheson (novel)	Hugh O'Brian as Christopher Martin / Chris Phillips, Gena Rowlands as Helen Martin	November 29, 1962
280	12	"Hangover"	Bernard Girard	Charles Runyon (short story)	Tony Randall as Hadley 'Had' Purvis, Jayne Mansfield as Marion	December 6, 1962
281	13	"Bonfire"	Joseph Pevney	William D. Gordon, Alfred Hayes	Peter Falk as Robert Evans, Dina Merrill as Laura	December 13, 1962
282	14	"The Tender Poisoner"	Leonard J. Horn	Lukas Heller (teleplay); John Bingham (novel)	Dan Dailey as Philip 'Barney' Bartel, Jan Sterling as Beatrice Bartel, Howard Duff as Peter Harding	December 20, 1962
283	15	"The Thirty-First of February"	Alf Kjellin	Julian Symons (novel); Richard Matheson (teleplay)	David Wayne as Andrew Anderson, William Conrad as Sergeant Cresse, Bob Crane as Charlie Lessing, Elizabeth Allen as Molly O'Rourke	January 4, 1963
284	16	"What Really Happened"	Jack Smight	Marie Belloc Lowndes (novel); Henry Slesar (teleplay)	Anne Francis as Eve Raydon, Ruth Roman as Adelaide 'Addie' Strain	January 11, 1963
285	17	"Forecast: Low Clouds and Coastal Fog"	Charles F. Haas	Lee Erwin	Inger Stevens as Karen Wilson, Dan O'Herlihy as Simon Carter	January 18, 1963
286	18	"A Tangled Web"	Alf Kjellin	Nicholas Blake (novel); James Bridges (teleplay)	Robert Redford as David Chesterman, Zohra Lampert as Marie Petit, Barry Morse as Karl Gault	January 25, 1963
287	19	"To Catch a Butterfly"	David Lowell Rich	Richard Fielder	Bradford Dillman as Bill Nelson, Ed Asner as Jack Stander	February 2, 1963
288	20	"The Paragon"	Jack Smight	Alfred Hayes (teleplay); Rebecca West (story)	Gary Merrill as John Pemberton, Joan Fontaine as Alice Pemberton	February 9, 1963
289	21	"I'll Be Judge—I'll Be Jury"	James Sheldon	Elizabeth Hely (novel); Lukas Heller (teleplay)	Peter Graves as Mark Needham, Rodolfo Hoyos, Jr. as Inspector Ortiz, Albert Salmi as Theodore Bond	February 15, 1963
290	22	"Diagnosis: Danger"	Sydney Pollack	Roland Kibbee	Michael Parks as Dr. Daniel Dana	March 1, 1963
291	23	"The Lonely Hours"	Jack Smight	Celia Fremlin (novel); William D. Morgan (story)	Nancy Kelly as Mrs. J.A. Williams / Vera Brandon, Gena Rowlands as Louise Henderson	March 8, 1963
292	24	"The Star Juror"	Herschel Daugherty	James Bridges	Dean Jagger as George Davies, Betty Field as Jenny Davies	March 15, 1963
293	25	"The Long Silence"	Robert Douglas	Charles Beaumont, William D. Gordon (teleplay); Hilda Lawrence (story "Composition for Four Hands")	Michael Rennie as Ralph Manson, Phyllis Thaxter as Nora Cory Manson	March 22, 1963
294	26	"An Out for Oscar"	Bernard Girard	Henry Kane (novel); David Goodis (teleplay)	Henry Silva as Bill Grant, Linda Christian as Eva Ashley, Larry Storch as Oscar Blenny	April 5, 1963
295	27	"Death and the Joyful Woman"	John Brahm	Ellis Peters (novel); James Bridges (teleplay)	Gilbert Roland as Luis Aguilar, Laraine Day as Ruth, Don Galloway as Al Aguilar	April 12, 1963
296	28	"Last Seen Wearing Blue Jeans"	Alan Crosland, Jr.	Amber Dean (novel); Lou Rambeau (teleplay)	Michael Wilding as David Saunders, Anna Lee as Roberta Saunders, Randy Boone as Pete Tanner	April 19, 1963
297	29	"The Dark Pool"	Jack Smight	Alec Coppel (story); William D. Gordon (teleplay)	Lois Nettleton as Dianne Castillejo, Anthony George as Victor Castillejo	May 3, 1963
298	30	"Dear Uncle George"	Joseph M. Newman	James Bridges (teleplay); Richard Levinson, William Link (story and teleplay)	Gene Barry as John Chambers / Uncle George, John Larkin as Simon Aldritch, Dabney Coleman as Tom Esterow, Patricia Donahue as Louise Chambers	May 10, 1963
299	31	"Run for Doom"	Bernard Girard	James Bridges (teleplay); Henry Kane (novel)	John Gavin as Dr. Don Reed, Diana Dors as Nickie Carole, Scott Brady as Bill Floyd	May 17, 1963
300	32	"Death of a Cop"	Joseph M. Newman	Leigh Brackett (teleplay); Douglas Warner (novel)	Victor Jory as Detective Paul Reardon, Peter Brown as Detective Philip Reardon, Richard Jaeckel as Boxer	May 24, 1963

== Season 9 (1963–64) ==
No. overall	No. in season	Title	Directed by	Written by	Stars	Original release date
301	1	"A Home Away from Home"	Herschel Daugherty	Robert Bloch	Ray Milland as Dr. Howard Fenwick	September 27, 1963
302	2	"A Nice Touch"	Joseph Pevney	Mann Rubin	Anne Baxter as Janice Brandt, George Segal as Larry Duke	October 4, 1963
303	3	"Terror at Northfield"	Harvey Hart	Leigh Brackett (teleplay); Ellery Queen (story)	Dick York as Sheriff Will Pearce, Jacqueline Scott as Susan Marsh, R.G. Armstrong as John Cooley	October 11, 1963
304	4	"You'll Be the Death of Me"	Robert Douglas	William D. Gordon (teleplay); Anthony Gilbert (story)	Robert Loggia as 'Driver' Arthur	October 18, 1963
305	5	"Blood Bargain"	Bernard Girard	Henry Slesar	Richard Kiley as Jim Derry, Richard Long as Eddie Breech, Anne Francis as Connie Breech	October 25, 1963
306	6	"Nothing Ever Happens in Linvale"	Herschel Daugherty	Richard Levinson, William Link	Gary Merrill as Harry Jarvis, Phyllis Thaxter as Mrs. Logan, Fess Parker as Sheriff Ben Wister	November 8, 1963
307	7	"Starring the Defense"	Joseph Pevney	Henry Slesar	Richard Basehart as Miles Crawford	November 15, 1963
308	8	"The Cadaver"	Alf Kjellin	James Bridges	Michael Parks as Skip Baxter, Joby Baker as Doc Carroll	November 29, 1963
309	9	"The Dividing Wall"	Bernard Girard	Joel Murcott (teleplay)	James Gregory as Fred Kruger, Katharine Ross as Carol Brandt	December 6, 1963
310	10	"Good-Bye, George"	Robert Stevens	William Fay	Robert Culp as Harry Lawrence, Stubby Kaye as George Cassidy	December 13, 1963
311	11	"How to Get Rid of Your Wife"	Alf Kjellin	Robert Gould	Bob Newhart as Gerald Swinney, Jane Withers as Edith Swinney	December 20, 1963
312	12	"Three Wives Too Many"	Joseph M. Newman	Kenneth Fearing (short story); Arthur A. Ross (teleplay)	Teresa Wright as Marion Brown, Dan Duryea as Raymond Brown	January 3, 1964
313	13	"The Magic Shop"	Robert Stevens	H. G. Wells (story); John Collier (teleplay)	Leslie Nielsen as Steven Grainger, Peggy McCay as Mrs. Grainger	January 10, 1964
314	14	"Beyond the Sea of Death"	Alf Kjellin	Miriam Allen DeFord (short story); William D. Gordon and Alfred Hayes (teleplay)	Mildred Dunnock as Minnie Briggs, Diana Hyland as Grace Renford	January 24, 1964
315	15	"Night Caller"	Alf Kjellin	Robert Westerby (teleplay)	Bruce Dern as Roy Bullock, Felicia Farr as Marcia Fowler	January 31, 1964
316	16	"The Evil of Adelaide Winters"	Laslo Benedek	Arthur A. Ross	Kim Hunter as Adelaide Winters, John Larkin as Edward Porter	February 7, 1964
317	17	"The Jar"	Norman Lloyd	Ray Bradbury (short story); James Bridges (teleplay)	Pat Buttram as Charlie Hill, Collin Wilcox as Thedy Sue Hill, George Lindsey Juke Marmer, Slim Pickens as Sheriff Clem Carter	February 14, 1964
318	18	"Final Escape"	William Witney	Thomas H. Cannan, Jr., Randall Hood (story); John Resko (teleplay)	Stephen McNally as Captain Tolman, Robert Keith as Doc, Edd Byrnes as Paul Perry	February 21, 1964
319	19	"Murder Case"	John Brahm	James Bridges	John Cassavetes as Lee Griffin, Gena Rowlands as Diana Justin	March 6, 1964
320	20	"Anyone for Murder?"	Leo Penn	Jack Ritchie (short story)	Barry Nelson as Dr. James Parkerson, Patricia Breslin as Doris Parkerson, Richard Dawson as Robert Johnson	March 13, 1964
321	21	"Beast in View"	Joseph M. Newman	Margaret Millar (novel); James Bridges (teleplay)	Joan Hackett as Helen Clarvoe, Kevin McCarthy as Paul Blackshear	March 20, 1964
322	22	"Behind the Locked Door"	Robert Douglas	Joel Murcott (teleplay)	Gloria Swanson as Mrs. Daniels, James MacArthur as Dave Snowden	March 27, 1964
323	23	"A Matter of Murder"	David Lowell Rich	Boris Sobelman	Darren McGavin as Sheridan Westcott, Patricia Crowley as Enid Bentley, Telly Savalas as Philadelphia Harry	April 3, 1964
324	24	"The Gentleman Caller"	Joseph M. Newman	James Bridges	Roddy McDowall as Gerald Musgrove, Ruth McDevitt as Miss Emmy Wright	April 10, 1964
325	25	"The Ordeal of Mrs. Snow"	Robert Stevens	Alvin Sargent	Patricia Collinge as Adelaide Snow, Jessica Walter as Lorna Richmond	April 17, 1964
326	26	"Ten Minutes from Now"	Alf Kjellin	Arthur A. Ross (teleplay); Jack Ritchie (short story)	Donnelly Rhodes as James Bellington, Lou Jacobi as Dr. Glover	May 1, 1964
327	27	"The Sign of Satan"	Robert Douglas	Barre Lyndon (teleplay); Robert Bloch (Return to the Sabbath short story)	Christopher Lee as Karl Jorla, Gia Scala as Kitty Frazier	May 8, 1964
328	28	"Who Needs an Enemy?"	Harry Morgan	Arthur A. Ross	Steven Hill as Charlie Osgood, Richard Anderson as Eddie Turtin, Joanna Moore as Danielle	May 15, 1964
329	29	"Bed of Roses"	Philip Leacock	James Bridges	Patrick O'Neal as George Maxwell, Kathie Browne as Mavis Maxwell	May 22, 1964
330	30	"The Second Verdict"	Lewis Teague	Alfred Hayes (teleplay); Henry Slesar (story)	Martin Landau as Edward 'Ned' Murray, Frank Gorshin as Lew Rydell, Nancy Kovack as Karen Osterman	May 29, 1964
331	31	"Isabel"	Alf Kjellin	William Fay (teleplay); S.B. Hough (novel); Henry Slesar (teleplay)	Bradford Dillman as Howard Clements, Barbara Barrie as Isabel Smith	June 5, 1964
332	32	"Body in the Barn"	Joseph M. Newman	Harold Swanton	Lillian Gish as Bessie Carnby, Maggie McNamara as Camilla	July 3, 1964

== Season 10 (1964–65) ==
No. overall	No. in season	Title	Directed by	Written by	Stars	Original release date
333	1	"The Return of Verge Likens"	Arnold Laven	James Bridges (teleplay); Davis Grubb (story)	Peter Fonda as Verge Likens, Robert Emhardt as Riley McGrath	October 5, 1964
334	2	"Change of Address"	David Friedkin	Andrew Benedict (story); Morton S. Fine, David Friedkin (teleplay)	Arthur Kennedy as Keith Hollands, Phyllis Thaxter as Elsa Hollands	October 12, 1964
335	3	"Water's Edge"	Bernard Girard	Robert Bloch (short story); Alfred Hayes (teleplay)	Ann Sothern as Helen Cox, John Cassavetes as Rusty Connors	October 19, 1964
336	4	"The Life Work of Juan Diaz"	Norman Lloyd	Ray Bradbury (teleplay/story)	Alejandro Rey as Juan Diaz, Frank Silvera as Alejandro	October 26, 1964
337	5	"See the Monkey Dance"	Joseph M. Newman	Lewis Davidson	Roddy McDowall as George, Efrem Zimbalist Jr. as Stranger	November 9, 1964
338	6	"Lonely Place"	Harvey Hart	Francis Gwaltney	Teresa Wright as Stella, Pat Buttram as Emory, Bruce Dern as Jesse	November 16, 1964
339	7	"The McGregor Affair"	David Friedkin	David Friedkin	Andrew Duggan as John McGregor, Elsa Lanchester as Aggie McGregor	November 23, 1964
340	8	"Misadventure"	Joseph M. Newman	Lewis Davidson	Barry Nelson as Colin, Lola Albright as Eva Martin, George Kennedy as George Martin	December 7, 1964
341	9	"Triumph"	Harvey Hart	Arthur A. Ross	Ed Begley as Brother Thomas Fitzgibbons, Jeanette Nolan as Mary Fitzgibbons	December 14, 1964
342	10	"Memo from Purgatory"	Joseph Pevney	Harlan Ellison	James Caan as Jay Shaw, Tony Musante as Candle, Walter Koenig as Tiger	December 21, 1964
343	11	"Consider Her Ways"	Robert Stevens	Oscar Millard	Barbara Barrie as Dr. Jane Sumner Waterleigh, Gladys Cooper as Laura	December 28, 1964
344	12	"Crimson Witness"	David Friedkin	David Friedkin	Peter Lawford as Ernest 'Ernie' Mullett, Martha Hyer as Judith 'Judy' Mullett, Julie London as Barbara	January 4, 1965
345	13	"Where the Woodbine Twineth"	Alf Kjellin	James Bridges	Margaret Leighton as Nell Snyder	January 11, 1965
346	14	"Final Performance"	John Brahm	Robert Bloch	Franchot Tone as The Great Rudolph (Rudolph Bitzner), Roger Perry as Cliff Allen, Sharon Farrell as Rosie	January 18, 1965
347	15	"Thanatos Palace Hotel"	Laslo Benedek	Arthur A. Ross (teleplay); André Maurois (story)	Angie Dickinson as Ariane Shaw, Steven Hill as Robert Manners	February 1, 1965
348	16	"One of the Family"	Joseph Pevney	Oscar Millard	Jeremy Slate as Dexter Dailey, Lilia Skala as Frieda Schmidt	February 8, 1965
349	17	"An Unlocked Window"	Joseph M. Newman	James Bridges (teleplay); Ethel Lina White (story)	Dana Wynter as Nurse Stella, T. C. Jones as Nurse Betty Ames, Louise Latham as Maude Isles, John Kerr as Glendon Baker	February 15, 1965
350	18	"The Trap"	John Brahm	Lee Kalcheim	Anne Francis as Peg Beale, Robert Strauss as Ted Beale, Donnelly Rhodes as John Cochran	February 22, 1965
351	19	"Wally the Beard"	James H. Brown	Arthur A. Ross	Larry Blyden as Walter Mills, Kathie Browne as Noreen Kimberly	March 1, 1965
352	20	"Death Scene"	Harvey Hart	James Bridges	Vera Miles as Nicky Revere/Monica Parrish, John Carradine as Gavin Revere, James Farentino as Leo Manfred	March 8, 1965
353	21	"The Photographer and the Undertaker"	Alex March	James Holding (story); Alfred Hayes teleplay	Jack Cassidy as Arthur Mannix, Harry Townes as Hiram Price	March 15, 1965
354	22	"Thou Still Unravished Bride"	David Friedkin	Avram Davidson (story); Morton S. Fine, David Friedkin	Ron Randell as Thomas 'Tommy' Bonn, David Carradine as Edward Clarke, Sally Kellerman as Sally Benner	March 22, 1965
355	23	"Completely Foolproof"	Alf Kjellin	Anthony Terpiloff	J. D. Cannon as Joe Brisson, Patricia Barry as Lisa Brisson	March 29, 1965
356	24	"Power of Attorney"	Harvey Hart	James Bridges (teleplay)	Richard Johnson as Jarvis Smith, Geraldine Fitzgerald as Agatha Tomlin, Fay Bainter as Mary Caulfield	April 5, 1965
357	25	"The World's Oldest Motive"	Harry Morgan	Lewis Davidson	Henry Jones as Alex Morrow, Linda Lawson as Fiona McNiece, Robert Loggia as Richard Schausak, Kathleen Freeman as Angela Morrow	April 12, 1965
358	26	"The Monkey's Paw—A Retelling"	Robert Stevens	Morton S. Fine, David Friedkin, Anthony Terpiloff (teleplay); W. W. Jacobs (story)	Leif Erickson as Paul White, Jane Wyatt as Anne White, Lee Majors as Howard White	April 19, 1965
359	27	"The Second Wife"	Joseph M. Newman	Robert Bloch (teleplay); Richard Deming (story)	June Lockhart as Martha Peters, John Anderson as Luke Hunter	April 26, 1965
360	28	"Night Fever"	Herbert Coleman	Gilbert Ralston (teleplay); Clark Howard (short story)	Colleen Dewhurst as Nurse Ellen Hatch, Tom Simcox as Jerry Walsh	May 3, 1965
361	29	"Off Season"	William Friedkin	Robert Bloch (teleplay); Edward D. Hoch (short story)	John Gavin as Johnny Kendall, Richard Jaeckel as Milt Woodman	May 10, 1965
