= Suspicion (American TV series) =

American TV series (1957–1958)

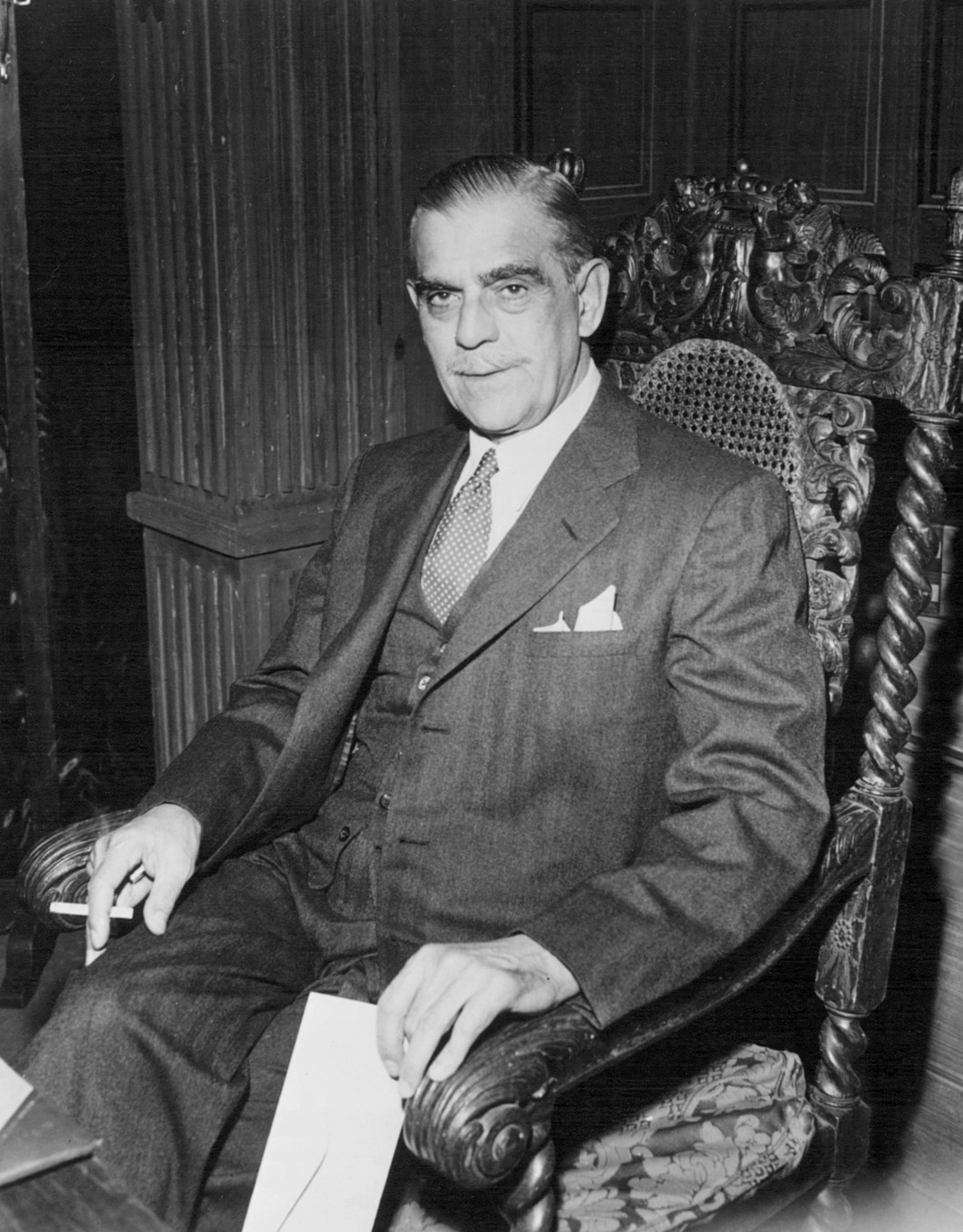
- Boris Karloff in the episode "The Deadly Game" (1957)
- Genre: Drama
- Directed by: Paul Bogart; John Brahm; Jules Bricken; William A. Graham; David Greene; Arthur Hiller; Alfred Hitchcock; Herbert Kenwith; Perry Lafferty; Don Medford; Lewis Milestone; Ray Milland; James Neilson; Elliot Silverstein; Jack Smight; Robert Stevens
- Presented by: Dennis O'Keefe; Walter Abel
- Theme music composer: Dave Kahn
- Country of origin: United States
- Original language: English
- No. of seasons: 1
- No. of episodes: 42

Production
- Executive producer: Alfred Hitchcock
- Producers: Joan Harrison; Frank P. Rosenberg; Richard Lewis; Jules Bricken; William Frye; Harry Tugend
- Editor: Edward W. Williams
- Camera setup: Multi-camera
- Running time: 60 minutes
- Production companies: Shamley Productions; Revue Studios

Original release
- Network: NBC
- Release: September 30, 1957 – July 21, 1958

Suspicion is the title of an American television mystery drama series which aired on the NBC from 1957 through 1958. The executive producer of half of the filmed episodes (10) of Suspicion was film director Alfred Hitchcock.

== Overview ==
The program was originally hosted by actor Dennis O'Keefe. In network repeats in 1959, Walter Abel became the host. The one-hour-long program, like others offered by Hitchcock, was designed to play on people's fears and suspicions. The first episode 'Four O'Clock', broadcast on 30 September 1957 and starring E. G. Marshall, was directed by Hitchcock himself.

Actors who appeared in this series include Claudette Colbert, Bette Davis, Eli Wallach, Roddy McDowall, Cathleen Nesbitt, James Daly, E. G. Marshall, William Shatner, Jack Klugman, Agnes Moorehead, Ross Martin, Margaret O'Brien, Rod Taylor, Audie Murphy, Harry Dean Stanton, Edmond O'Brien and Joanne Linville.

The show's sponsors included Ford Motor Company and Philip Morris.

== Episodes ==
- Filmed Episodes, some of which may be live, and for most of which prints of varying quality exist and are available commercially on DVD.
- 1:1 "Four O'Clock": E. G. Marshall dir: Alfred Hitchcock (teleplay by Francis Cockrell, based on a story by Cornell Woolrich)
- 1:2 "Murder Me Gently": Joseph Buloff, Reginald Gardiner, Kurt Kasznar, Jessica Tandy dir: Don Medford
- 1:3 "The Other Side of the Curtain": Donna Reed, Jeff Richards dir: James Neilson (teleplay by James P. Cavanagh, story by Helen McCloy)
- 1:4 "Hand in Glove": Fred Gwynne, Burgess Meredith, Cathleen Nesbitt dir: Jack Smight
- 1:5 "The Story of Marjorie Reardon": Margaret O'Brien, Rod Taylor, Henry Silva, Michael Landon dir: John Brahm (teleplay by John Kneubuhl, based on a story by Susan Seavy)
- 1:6 "Diary for Death": Macdonald Carey, Jack Klugman, Everett Sloane, Julie Wilson dir: Perry Lafferty
- 1:7 "Heartbeat": David Wayne, Pat Hingle, Barbara Turner, Warren Beatty, Frank Campanella dir: Robert Stevens (teleplay by Ernest Kinoy, based on a story by Terence John)
- 1:8 "The Sparkle of Diamonds" Ralph Bellamy, Martin E. Brooks, Betty Garde, Margaret Leighton dir: Jack Smight (written by James Parish)
- 1:9 "The Flight": Audie Murphy, Jack Warden, Everett Sloane, Susan Kohner dir: James Neilson (written by Halsted Welles and Gene L. Coon)
- 1:10 "Rainy Day": Robert Flemyng, George Cole, John Williams, Tom Conway dir: James Neilson (teleplay by Michael Pertwee, based on a story by W. Somerset Maugham)
- 1:11 "The Deadly Game": Boris Karloff, Gary Merrill, Harry Townes, Joseph Wiseman dir: Don Medford (teleplay by James Yaffe, based on a novel by Friedrich Durrenmatt)
- 1:12 "Doomsday": Dan Duryea, Robert Middleton, Charles Bronson dir: Bernard Girard (written by Sy Bartlett)
- 1:13 "The Dark Stairway": Jack Klugman, Marian Seldes, Phyllis Thaxter dir: Don Medford
- 1:14 "Someone Is After Me" [possibly lost]: Edward Andrews, Patricia Neal, Lee Bowman dir: David Greene (written by Robert Soderberg)
- 1:15 "Lord Arthur Savile's Crime": Ronald Howard, Rosemary Harris, Gladys Cooper, Sebastian Cabot, Melville Cooper dir: Robert Stevens (teleplay by Francis Cockrell, based on a short story by Oscar Wilde)
- 1:16 "End in Violence"": John Ireland, Lisa Clark dir: Paul Bogart (teleplay by Harold Gast, based on a novel by Lorenz Heller)
- 1:17 "Comfort for the Grave": Paul Douglas, Jan Sterling, Anthony Caruso dir: Jules Bricken (teleplay by Halsey Malone and Virginia E. Spies, story by Richard Deming)
- 1:18 "Meeting in Paris": Rory Calhoun, Jane Greer, Walter Abel dir: James Neilson (Elliot West and Stirling Silliphant based on a story by Elliot West)
- 1:19 "A Touch of Evil": Harry Guardino, Audrey Totter, Bethel Leslie, John Carradine dir: John Brahm (teleplay by Halsted Welles, based on a magazine article by E.J. Kahn, Jr.)
- 1:20 "If I Die before I Live" [possibly lost]: Edie Adams, Joseph Congdon, James Gregory, Joseph Sweeney dir: Frank P. Rosenberg (written by James P. Davis)
- 1:21 "The Hollow Man": Dane Clark, Georgann Johnson, Ross Martin dir: Elliot Silverstein (written by George Lefferts)
- 1:22 "A World Full of Strangers": John Baragrey, Janice Rule, Kathryn Sergava dir: Don Medford (teleplay by James Yaffee, based on a story by William Wise)
- 1:23 "The Eye of Truth": Joseph Cotten, George Peppard, Leora Dana, Philip Van Zandt dir: Robert Stevens (written by Eric Ambler)
- 1:24 "The Voice in the Night": Barbara Rush, James Donald, Patrick Macnee, James Coburn dir: Arthur Hiller (teleplay by Stirling Silliphant, based on a short story by William Hope Hodgson)
- 1:25 "Diagnosis: Death": Larry Parks, Anne Meacham, Nancy Wickwire dir: Don Medford (written by Ernest Kinoy)
- 1:26 "The Bull Skinner": Rod Steiger, John Beal, Sallie Brophy, Harold J. Stone dir: Lewis Milestone (written by Ernest Kinoy)
- 1:27 "The Girl Upstairs": Douglas Campbell, Denholm Elliott dir: Don Medford (written by Patrick Hamilton)
- 1:28 "Fraction of a Second": Bette Davis, Barry Atwater, Marian Seldes, Judson Pratt dir: John Brahm (teleplay by Kathleen Hite, from a story by Daphne du Maurier)
- 1:29 "The Way Up to Heaven": Marion Lorne, Sebastian Cabot, Patricia Smith, dir: Herschel Daugherty (teleplay by Marian Cockrell, based on a short story by Roald Dahl)
- 1:30 "The Woman with Red Hair": Roddy McDowall, Dennis O'Keefe, Marian Seldes dir: William A. Graham (written by Sam Locke)
- 1:31 "Protégé": Agnes Moorehead, Phyllis Love, William Shatner, Jack Klugman, dir: Jules Bricken (written by Richard Berg)
- 1:32 "The Velvet Vault": James Congdon, John Heldabrand, Carmen Matthews, Elizabeth Montgomery dir: David Greene (written by William Altman)
- 1:33 "The Slayer and the Slain": John Baragrey (written by Sarett Tobias)
- 1:34 "Death Watch": Edmond O'Brien, Janice Rule, Herb Ellis dir: Ray Milland (written by John and Ward Hawkins)
- 1:35 "The Man with the Gun": Maureen Hurley, Carlos Montalban, Anthony Quayle, Alfred Ryder dir: Jack Smight (teleplay by Arthur Arent, based on a story by W. E. C. Fairchild)
- 1:36 "The Woman Turned to Salt": Michael Rennie, Pamela Brown, Susan Oliver, Rafael Campos, Pat Hitchcock dir: Robert Stevens (teleplay by Stirling Silliphant, based on a story by F. Tennyson Jesse)
- 1:37 "Eye for an Eye": Ray Milland, Macdonald Carey, Kathleen Crowley, Andrew Duggan dir: Jules Bricken (written by John Kneubuhl and Jameson Brewer based on a novel by Leigh Brackett) (spun-off into the series Markham)
- 1:38 "Return From Darkness": Phyllis Thaxter, Lorne Greene, John Baragrey, Phyllis Hill, Charles Mendick, Ed Bryce (written by Lester Powell)
- 1:39 "The Devil Makes Three": Dennis O'Keefe, James Daly, Dolores Dorn-Heft (written by Marc Brendel)
- 1:40 "The Imposter": Roddy McDowell, Kent Smith, Joanna Moore, Elizabeth Wilson, Geoffrey Lumb, dir: Don Medford (written by Theodore Apstein)
- 1:41 "The Death of Paul Dane": Janice Rule, Eli Wallach, Warren Stevens, Janice Rule (written by Morton Wishengrad and Virginia Mazer)

== See also ==
- List of Alfred Hitchcock Presents episodes
