= Bryce Walton =

American writer

- Born: May 31, 1918; Blythedale, Missouri, U.S.
- Died: February 5, 1988 (aged 69); Van Nuys, California, U.S.
- Other names: Kenneth O'Hara, Paul Franklin
- Education: California State University
- Occupation: Writer
- Spouse: Ruth Arschinov
- Children: 1

Bryce Walton (May 31, 1918 – February 5, 1988) was an American pulp fiction writer.

Walton was born in Blythedale, Missouri, the son of Paul Dean Walton and Golda Powers. He held various jobs starting in 1938, and attended Los Angeles Junior College 1939–41. During World War II, he served as a navy correspondent. In 1945, he began a career as a freelance writer. He attended California State College from 1946 to 1947, then married photographer Ruth Arschinov on January 1, 1954. The couple had one daughter, Krissta Kay.

He was credited as a writer for the TV serial Captain Video and His Video Rangers. A reference guide published in 2010 made the unsupported claim that Walton won a 1961 Alfred Hitchcock Best Short Story award. However the existence of such award has subsequently been called into question. He wrote three episodes of Alfred Hitchcock Presents, and two of his stories were adapted for the series, including "The Greatest Monster of Them All".

== Bibliography ==
- Sons of the Ocean Deeps (1952)
- The Long Night (1952)
- Captain Video and his Video Rangers (1953)
- Cave of Danger (1967)
- Harpoon Gunner (1968)
- Hurricane Reef (1970)
- Cave of Danger (1971)
- The Fire Trail (1974)
