= Helen Nielsen =

American writer

Helen Nielsen (23 October 1918, Roseville, Illinois – 22 June 2002, Prescott, Arizona) was an author of mysteries and television scripts for such television dramas as Perry Mason and Alfred Hitchcock Presents.

She was born in Roseville, Illinois, and studied journalism, art and aeronautical drafting at various schools, including the Chicago Art Institute. Before her writing career, she worked as a draftsman during World War II and contributed to the designs of B-36, XB-47, and P-80 aircraft.

Her stories were often set in Laguna Beach and Oceanside, California where she lived for 60 years.

Some of her novels were reprinted by Black Lizard, including Detour and Sing Me a Murder.
