= John Williams (actor) =

English actor (1903–1983)

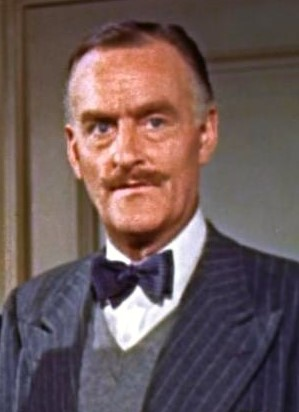
- Williams in the 1954 film Dial M for Murder
- Born: 15 April 1903; Chalfont St Giles, England
- Died: 5 May 1983 (aged 80); San Diego, California, U.S.
- Occupation: Actor
- Years active: 1924–1979
- Spouse: Helen Williams

Hugh Ernest Leo Williams (Note: Several primary sources suggest this was his birth name.) (15 April 1903 – 5 May 1983), known professionally as John Williams, was an English stage, film and television actor. He is remembered for his role as Chief Inspector Hubbard in Alfred Hitchcock's Dial M for Murder, as the chauffeur in Billy Wilder's Sabrina (both 1954), as Mr. Brogan-Moore in Witness for the Prosecution (1957) and as the second "Mr. French" on TV's Family Affair in its first season (1967).

== Life and work ==
Born in Chalfont St Giles in Buckinghamshire, England, in 1903, Williams was educated at Lancing College. He began his acting career on the English stage in 1916, appearing in J. M. Barrie's Peter Pan, Frances Nordstrom's The Ruined Lady, and Frederick Lonsdale's The Fake.

In 1924 Williams moved to New York, where he was cast in a series of successful Broadway productions. He would appear in over 30 Broadway plays over the next four decades, performing on stage with performers such as Claudette Colbert in Clifford Grey's A Kiss in the Taxi in 1925, Helen Hayes in J. M. Barrie's Alice Sit-by-the-Fire and Gertrude Lawrence in George Bernard Shaw's Pygmalion in 1946. In 1953, Williams won a Tony Award for Actor, Supporting or Featured (Dramatic) for his role as Chief Inspector Hubbard in Frederick Knott's Dial M for Murder on Broadway. Soon afterwards, when Alfred Hitchcock adapted the play to a film version released in 1954, he cast Williams in the same role.

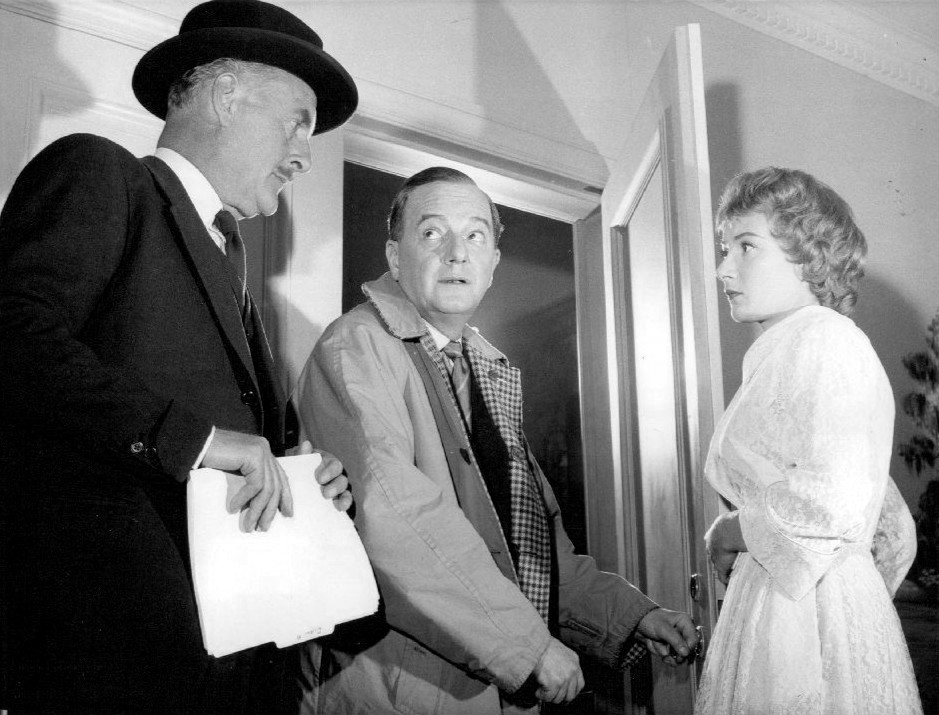
Williams reprised his Broadway role in Dial M for Murder for a 1958 Hallmark Hall of Fame television presentation. Also pictured are Maurice Evans and Rosemary Harris.

Williams' first appearance in a Hollywood film was in director Mack Sennett's short The Chumps (1930). He ultimately appeared in more than 40 films, including two other Hitchcock films: The Paradine Case (1947) starring Gregory Peck, in which Williams held a minor role as a barrister, and To Catch a Thief (1955) with Cary Grant and Grace Kelly, in which Williams portrayed a major character—a Lloyd's of London insurance representative. In the 1960 thriller Midnight Lace, starring Doris Day, Williams played a London police inspector much like his character in Dial M for Murder.

He also made more than 40 guest appearances on television shows. He played in several episodes of Alfred Hitchcock Presents including: "The Long Shot" (1955), "Back for Christmas" (1956), "Whodunit" (1956), "Wet Saturday" (1956), "The Rose Garden" (1956), the three-part episode "I Killed the Count" (1957), "The Three Dreams of Mr. Findlater" (1957), and "Banquo's Chair" (1959). Three of these episodes, "Back for Christmas", "Wet Saturday", and "Banquo's Chair", were directed by Hitchcock himself.

Williams played William Shakespeare in The Twilight Zone episode "The Bard" (1963) and guest-starred on the sitcom My Three Sons (also 1963), portraying a stuffy, very precise English butler. In the latter role he was clean shaven, not sporting his customary mustache. Later, he was briefly part of the regular cast of the family comedy Family Affair (1967). He appeared as well on Night Gallery in the series' episode "The Doll" (1971). One of Williams' last performances was in 1979, playing alongside fellow actor Lorne Greene in a two-part episode of Battlestar Galactica titled "War of the Gods".

Williams gained notice too as the star of a frequently telecast commercial for 120 Music Masterpieces, a four-LP set of classical music excerpts from Columbia House. This became the longest-running nationally seen commercial in U.S. television history, for 13 years from 1971 to 1984. The commercial began with a brief selection of orchestral music being played. Williams then began the sales promotion with the following:

I'm sure you recognise this lovely melody as 'Stranger in Paradise'. But did you know that the original theme is from the Polovtsian Dance No. 2 by Borodin? So many of the tunes of our well-known popular songs were actually written by the great masters—like these familiar themes...

In addition to his longstanding association with Hitchcock, Williams appeared in three Billy Wilder films over the course of his career: Sabrina (1954), Witness for the Prosecution (1957), and The Private Life of Sherlock Holmes (1970). In Holmes, however, his scenes were among the 60 to 75 minutes cut by the studio prior to the film's release, when the studio decided not to release it in its intended roadshow format. Williams' scenes, along with the majority of the cut material, have not been recovered.

== Death ==
Williams died at the age of 80 on 5 May 1983, in La Jolla, San Diego, California. It was reported at the time of his death that he had been suffering from a heart condition. He was cremated, and there was no funeral.

== Selected filmography ==
Year	Film	Role	Notes
1936	Mr. Deeds Goes to Town	(uncredited) (?)	
1942	The Big Blockade	Voice over (uncredited)	
1942	The Next of Kin	General Cooper (uncredited)	
1942	The Foreman Went to France	'English' Army Captain	
1942	The Goose Steps Out	Major Bishop	
1947	The Paradine Case	Barrister Collins (uncredited)	
1948	A Woman's Vengeance	Prosecuting Counsel	
1951	Kind Lady	Mr. Foster	
1951	Dick Turpin's Ride	Archbald Puffin	
1951	Thunder in the East	General Sir Henry Harrison	
1954	Dial M for Murder	Chief Inspector Hubbard	
1954	The Student Prince	Lutz	
1954	Sabrina	Thomas Fairchild	
1955	To Catch a Thief	H. H. Hughson	
1956	D-Day the Sixth of June	Brigadier Russell	
1956	The Solid Gold Cadillac	John T. "Jack" Blessington	
1957	Island in the Sun	Colonel Whittingham	
1957	Will Success Spoil Rock Hunter?	Irving La Salle Jr.	
1957	Witness for the Prosecution	Mr. Brogan-Moore, Sir Wilfrid's junior counsel in the trial	
1959	The Young Philadelphians	Gilbert Dickinson	
1960	Visit to a Small Planet	Delton	
1960	Midnight Lace	Inspector Byrnes	
1965	Dear Brigitte	Peregrine Upjohn	
1965	Harlow	Jonathan Martin	
1966	The Last of the Secret Agents?	J. Fredrick Duval	
1967	Double Trouble	Gerald Waverly	
1968	The Secret War of Harry Frigg	General Francis Mayhew	
1968	A Flea in Her Ear	Dr. Finache	
1970	The Private Life of Sherlock Holmes	Havelock-Smith	Scene deleted
1972	The Hound of the Baskervilles	Arthur Frankland	
1974	Lost in the Stars	Judge	
1976	No Deposit, No Return	Jameson	
1978	Hot Lead and Cold Feet	Mansfield	

== Television ==
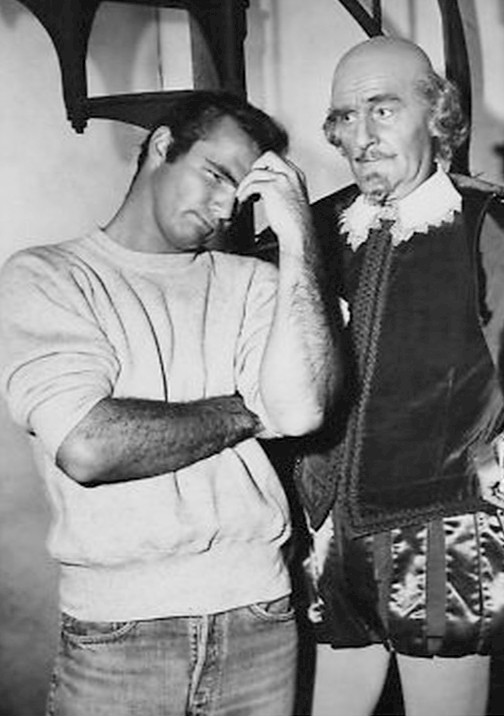
Burt Reynolds and John Williams in "The Bard", a 1963 episode of The Twilight Zone

- Alfred Hitchcock Presents
  - "The Long Shot" (Season 1 Episode 9) (1955) – Walker Hendricks
  - "Back for Christmas" (Season 1 Episode 23) (1956) – Herbert Carpenter
  - "Whodunit" (Season 1 Episode 26) (1956) – Alexander Penn Arlington
  - "Wet Saturday" (Season 2 Episode 1) (1956) – Captain Smollet
  - "The Rose Garden" (Season 2 Episode 12) (1956) – Alexander Vinton
  - "I Killed the Count" (Season 2 Episodes 25, 26, 27) (3-part episode, 1957) – Inspector Davidson
  - "The Three Dreams of Mr. Findlater" (Season 2 Episode 30) (1957) – Ernest Findlater
  - "Banquo's Chair" (Season 4 Episode 29) (1959) – Inspector Brent
- Hallmark Hall of Fame, "Dial M for Murder" (1958) – Chief Inspector Hubbard
- The Investigators, "The Oracle" (1961) – Joseph Lombard
- The Twilight Zone, "The Bard" (1963) – William Shakespeare
- My Three Sons, "Bub's Butler" (1963) - Charles Augustus Caesar Bevins.
- The Lucy Show, "Lucy and the Great Bank Robbery" (1964) – Gordon Bentley
- Combat!, "The Furlough" (1966) – Edmund Tinsley
- Family Affair (9 episodes, 1967) – Nigel "Niles" French (Replaced Sebastian Cabot while he was recovering from an injury to his wrist)
- The Wild Wild West, "The Night of the Bleak Island" (1969) – Sir Nigel Scott
- Mission: Impossible, "Lover's Knot" (1970) – Lord Richard Weston
- Night Gallery, "The Doll" (1971) – Colonel Hymber Masters
- Night Gallery, "The Caterpillar" (1972) – Doctor
- Columbo "Dagger of the Mind" (1972) – Sir Roger Haversham
- Battlestar Galactica, "War of the Gods" (2-part episode, 1979) – Council Member
