= Alfred Hitchcock Presents =

American anthology television series (1955–1965)

- Title card
- Also known as: The Alfred Hitchcock Hour (1962–1965)
- Genre: Anthology; Mystery; Thriller; Horror
- Created by: Alfred Hitchcock
- Presented by: Alfred Hitchcock
- Theme music composer: Charles Gounod
- Opening theme: "Funeral March of a Marionette" by Charles Gounod
- Composer: Stanley Wilson (music supervisor)
- Country of origin: United States
- Original language: English
- No. of seasons: 10
- No. of episodes: 268 (Alfred Hitchcock Presents); 93 (The Alfred Hitchcock Hour); 361 (total); (list of episodes)

Production
- Executive producer: Alfred Hitchcock
- Producers: Joan Harrison; Norman Lloyd
- Editor: Edward W. Williams
- Camera setup: Single-camera
- Running time: 25–26 minutes (Seasons 1–7); 50 minutes (Seasons 8–10)
- Production companies: Revue Studios; (1955–63); Universal Television; (1963–65); Shamley Productions

Original release
- Network: CBS; (1955–60; 1962–64); NBC; (1960–62; 1964–65)
- Release: October 2, 1955 – May 10, 1965

Related
- Alfred Hitchcock Presents (1985)

Alfred Hitchcock Presents is an American television anthology series created, produced, and hosted by Alfred Hitchcock, airing on CBS and NBC, alternately, between 1955 and 1965. It features dramas, thrillers, and mysteries. In 1962, it was renamed The Alfred Hitchcock Hour. Hitchcock directed 18 of the series' 361 episodes.

By the time the show premiered on October 2, 1955, Hitchcock had been directing films for over three decades. In the 21st century, Time named Alfred Hitchcock Presents as one of its 100 Best TV Shows of All Time. The Writers Guild of America ranked it number 79 on its list of the 101 Best-Written TV Series, tying it with Monty Python's Flying Circus, Star Trek: The Next Generation, and Upstairs, Downstairs. In 2021, Rolling Stone ranked it 18th on its list of the 30 Best Horror TV Shows of All Time.

== History ==
Alfred Hitchcock Presents is well known for its title sequence. The camera fades in on a simple line-drawing caricature of Hitchcock's rotund profile (which Hitchcock drew), to the theme music of Charles Gounod's "Funeral March of a Marionette" (suggested by Hitchcock's long-time musical collaborator Bernard Herrmann). Hitchcock appears in silhouette from the right edge of the screen, and then walks to center screen to eclipse the caricature. The caricature drawing and Gounod's "Funeral March of a Marionette" have become indelibly associated with Hitchcock in popular culture.

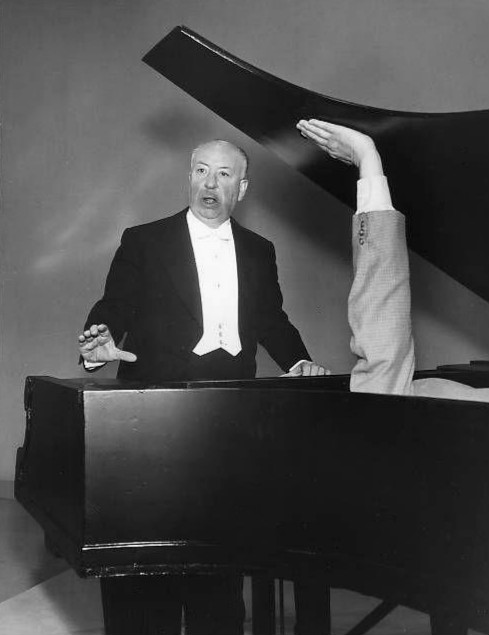
Alfred Hitchcock introduces each episode

After the title sequence, Hitchcock almost always greets his audience with, "Good evening," before drolly introducing the story from an empty studio or from the set of the current episode; his usually comical monologues were written by James B. Allardice. At least two versions of the opening were shot for every episode. A version intended for the American audience would often spoof a recent popular commercial or poke fun at the sponsor, leading into the commercial.

Hitchcock closed the show in much the same way as he opened it, but mainly to tie up loose ends rather than joke. Frequently, a leading character in the story seemed to have gotten away with a criminal activity. In the postscript, Hitchcock then would briefly detail, usually unconvincingly, how fate (or the authorities) eventually brought the character to justice. Hitchcock told TV Guide that his reassurances that the criminal had been apprehended were "a necessary gesture to morality."

Alfred Hitchcock Presents finished at number six in the Nielsen ratings for the 1956–57 season, number 12 in 1957–58, number 24 in 1958–59, and number 25 in 1959–60. The series was originally 25 minutes per episode, but it was expanded to 50 minutes in 1962 and retitled The Alfred Hitchcock Hour. Hitchcock directed 17 of the 267 filmed episodes of Alfred Hitchcock Presents — four during the first season and one or two per season thereafter. He directed only the fourth of the 93 extended episodes, entitled "I Saw the Whole Thing" with John Forsythe. The last new episode aired on June 26, 1965, but the series has continued to be popular in television syndication for decades, including in the UK, where it currently is being shown on Sky Arts.

== Guest stars and other actors ==
Actors appearing in the most episodes include Patricia Hitchcock (Hitchcock's daughter), Dick York, Robert Horton, James Gleason, John Williams, Robert H. Harris, Russell Collins, Barbara Baxley, Ray Teal, Percy Helton, Phyllis Thaxter, Carmen Mathews, Mildred Dunnock, Alan Napier, Robert Vaughn, and Vincent Price. Such notables as Clint Eastwood, Peter Lawford, Robert Redford, Inger Stevens, Cedric Hardwicke, Steve McQueen, Audrey Meadows, Bruce Dern, Robert Duvall, Walter Matthau, Robert Loggia, George Segal, Laurence Harvey, Claude Rains, Joan Fontaine, Thelma Ritter, Sam Reese, Dennis Morgan, Joseph Cotten, Burt Reynolds, Vera Miles, Tom Ewell, Peter Lorre, Bette Davis, Dean Stockwell, Jessica Tandy, John Gavin, Charles Bronson, Michael Rennie, Phyllis Thaxter, Roger Moore, John Cassavetes, Peter Falk, Teresa Wright, Leslie Nielsen, Ricardo Montalbán, Henry Silva, Harry Dean Stanton, John Forsythe, Cloris Leachman, and Barbara Bel Geddes, among many others, also appeared on the series.

== Directors ==
The directors who helmed the most episodes include Robert Stevens (44 episodes), Paul Henreid (28 episodes), Herschel Daugherty (24 episodes), Norman Lloyd (19 episodes), Alfred Hitchcock (17 episodes), Arthur Hiller (17 episodes), James Neilson (12 episodes), Justus Addiss (10 episodes), and John Brahm (10 episodes). Other notable directors included Robert Altman, Ida Lupino, Stuart Rosenberg, Robert Stevenson, David Swift, and William Friedkin, who directed the last episode of the show.

== Broadcast history ==
Season	Title	Episodes	Originally released			Rank	Rating
Season	Title	Episodes	First released	Last released	Network	Rank	Rating
1	Alfred Hitchcock Presents	39	October 2, 1955	June 24, 1956	CBS	—N/a	—N/a
2	Alfred Hitchcock Presents	39	September 30, 1956	June 23, 1957	CBS	6	33.9
3	Alfred Hitchcock Presents	39	October 6, 1957	June 29, 1958	CBS	12	30.3 (Tied with Cheyenne)
4	Alfred Hitchcock Presents	36	October 5, 1958	June 21, 1959	CBS	24	26.8
5	Alfred Hitchcock Presents	38	September 27, 1959	September 25, 1960	CBS	25	24.1
6	Alfred Hitchcock Presents	38	September 27, 1960	July 4, 1961	NBC	—N/a	—N/a
7	Alfred Hitchcock Presents	39 (Note: The 39th episode of season 7 was never broadcast.)	October 10, 1961	June 26, 1962	NBC	—N/a	—N/a
8	The Alfred Hitchcock Hour	32	September 20, 1962	May 24, 1963	CBS	—N/a	—N/a
9	The Alfred Hitchcock Hour	32	September 27, 1963	July 3, 1964	CBS	—N/a	—N/a
10	The Alfred Hitchcock Hour	29	October 5, 1964	May 10, 1965	NBC	—N/a	—N/a

The broadcast history was as follows:

- Sunday at 9:30–10:00 pm on CBS: October 2, 1955 – September 1960
- Tuesday at 8:30–9:00 pm on NBC: September 1960 – September 1962
- Thursday at 10:00–11:00 pm on CBS: September 1962 – December 1962
- Friday at 9:30–10:30 pm on CBS: January 1963 – September 1963
- Friday at 10:00–11:00 pm on CBS: September 1963 – September 1964
- Monday at 10:00–11:00 pm on NBC: October 1964 – September 1965

== Episodes ==
Actors and actresses in episodes of the series

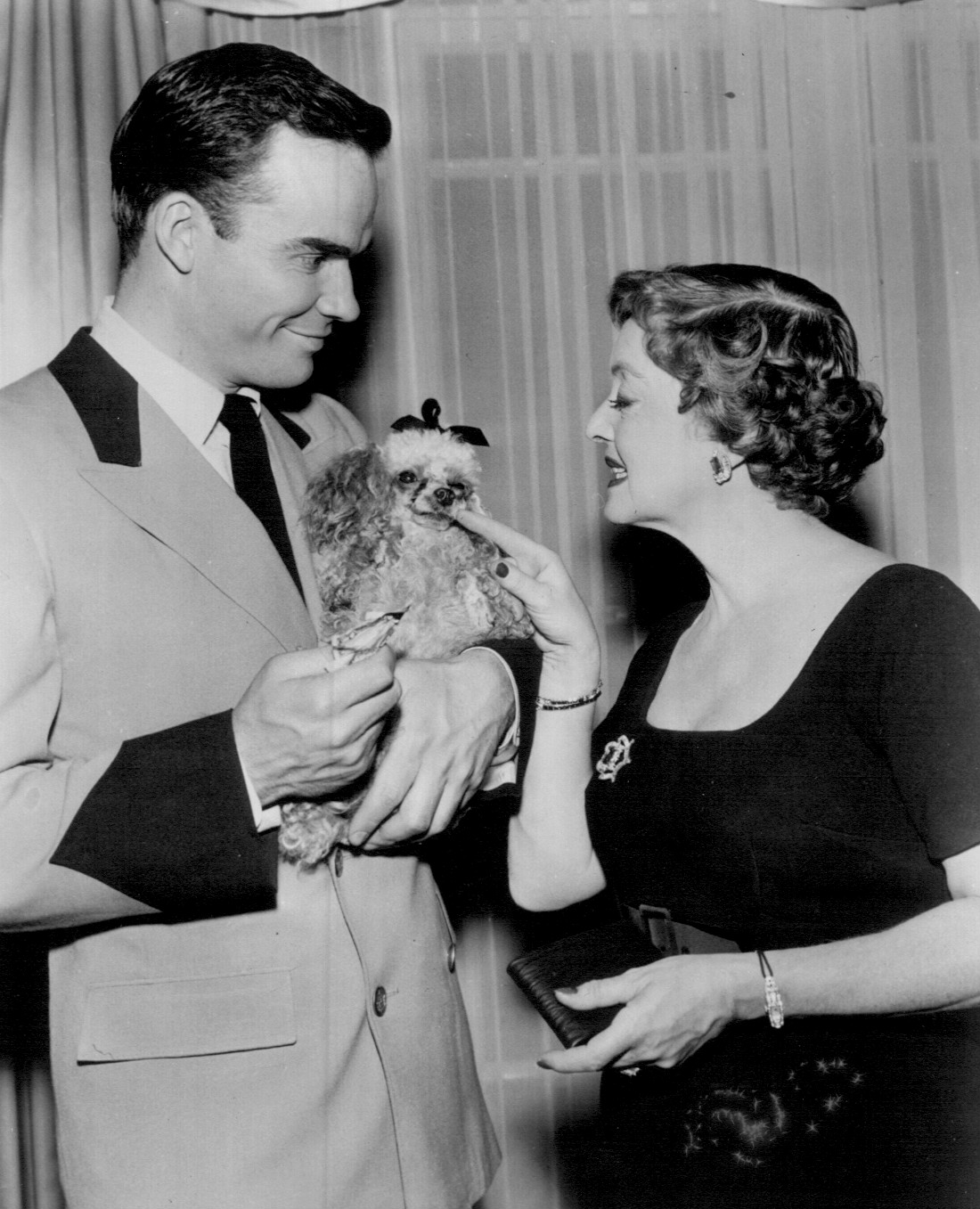
James Congdon and Bette Davis in "Out There – Darkness" (1959)

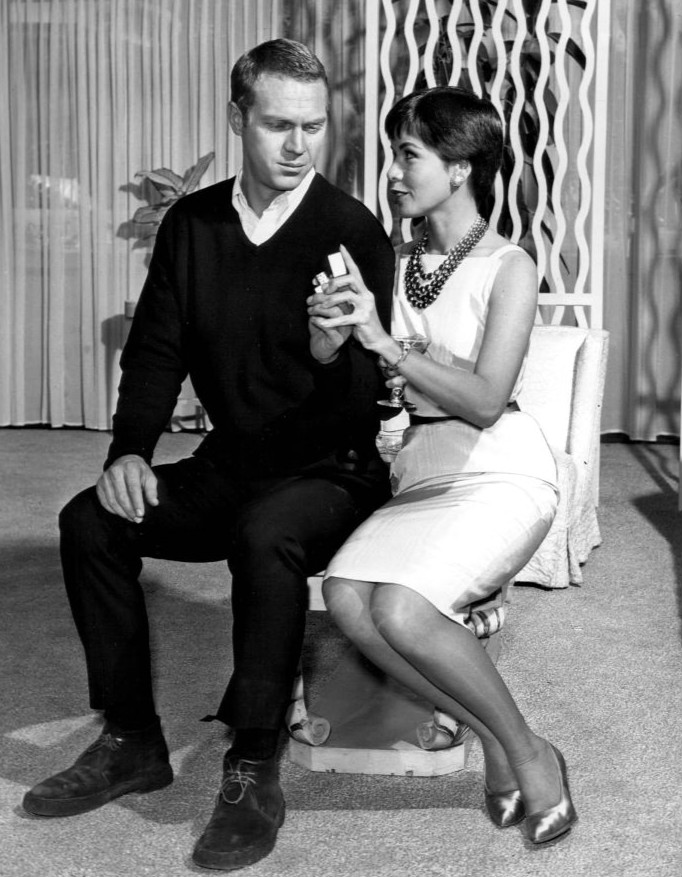
Steve McQueen and wife Neile Adams in "Man from the South" (1960)

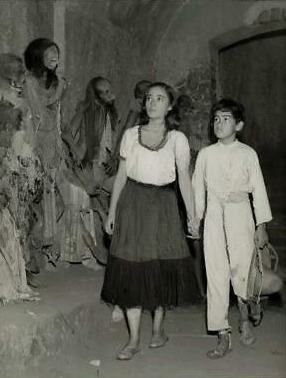
Pina Pellicer and Larry Domasin in "The Life Work of Juan Diaz" (1964)

Alfred Hitchcock Presents, 25 minutes long, aired weekly at 9:30 on CBS on Sunday nights from 1955 to 1960, and then at 8:30 on NBC on Tuesday nights from 1960 to 1962. It was followed by The Alfred Hitchcock Hour, which lasted for three seasons, September 1962 to June 1965, adding another 93 episodes to the 268 already produced for Alfred Hitchcock Presents.

Two episodes that were directed by Hitchcock were nominated for Emmy Awards. The first was "The Case of Mr. Pelham" in 1955 that starred Tom Ewell, and the second was "Lamb to the Slaughter" in 1958 that starred Barbara Bel Geddes and Harold J. Stone. In 2009, TV Guide's list of 100 Greatest Episodes of All Time ranked "Lamb to the Slaughter" at number 59. The third season opener "The Glass Eye" (1957) won an Emmy Award for director Robert Stevens. An episode of The Alfred Hitchcock Hour titled "An Unlocked Window" (1965) earned an Edgar Award for writer James Bridges in 1966.

Among the most famous episodes remains writer Roald Dahl's "Man from the South" (1960) starring Steve McQueen and Peter Lorre, in which a man bets his finger that he can start his lighter 10 times in a row. This episode was ranked number 41 on TV Guide's 100 Greatest Episodes of All Time. The episode was later referenced and remade in the film Four Rooms, with Quentin Tarantino directing a segment called "The Man from Hollywood".

The 1962 episode "The Sorcerer's Apprentice" was not aired by NBC because the sponsor felt that the ending was too gruesome. The plot has a magician's helper performing a "sawing a woman in half" trick. Not knowing that the performance is meant to be an illusion, the helper actually cuts a woman in half. The episode was included in the syndication package for the series and is now considered to be in the public domain.

== Home media ==
Universal Studios released the first five seasons of Alfred Hitchcock Presents on DVD in Region 1. Season 6 was released on November 12, 2013 via Amazon.com's CreateSpace program. This is a manufacture-on-demand release on DVD-R, available exclusively through Amazon.com.

In Region 2, Universal Pictures UK has released the first three seasons on DVD, and Fabulous Films has released all seven seasons on DVD, including all three seasons of The Alfred Hitchcock Hour.

In Region 4, Madman Entertainment has released all seven seasons on DVD in Australia. They have also released all three seasons of The Alfred Hitchcock Hour.

DVD title	Episodes	Release dates		
DVD title	Episodes	Region 1	Region 2	Region 4
Season One	39	October 4, 2005; March 13, 2018 (re-release)	February 20, 2006	July 15, 2009
Season Two	39	October 17, 2006	March 26, 2007	November 17, 2009
Season Three	39	October 9, 2007	April 14, 2008	May 17, 2010
Season Four	36	November 24, 2009	October 26, 2015	September 29, 2010
Season Five	38	January 3, 2012	October 26, 2015	May 18, 2011
Season Six	38	November 12, 2013 (DVD-R)	October 26, 2015	November 16, 2011
Season Seven	38	October 24, 2025	October 26, 2015	February 20, 2013

DVD title	Episodes	Region 2	Region 4
The Alfred Hitchcock Hour: The Complete First Season	32	January 11, 2016	May 22, 2013
The Alfred Hitchcock Hour: The Complete Second Season	32	January 11, 2016	May 22, 2013
The Alfred Hitchcock Hour: The Complete Third Season	29	January 11, 2016	May 22, 2013

== 1985 revival ==
In 1985, NBC aired a new TV movie pilot based upon the series, combining four newly filmed stories with colorized footage of Hitchcock from the original series to introduce each segment. The movie was a huge ratings success. The Alfred Hitchcock Presents revival series debuted in the fall of 1985 and retained the same format as the pilot - newly filmed stories (a mixture of original works and updated remakes of original series episodes) with colorized introductions by Hitchcock. The new series lasted only one season before NBC cancelled it, but it was then produced for three more years by the USA Network.

== In other media ==
Alfred Hitchcock Presents used Charles Gounod's "Funeral March of a Marionette" (1872) as its theme song. Hitchcock heard it first in F. W. Murnau's 1927 film Sunrise: A Song of Two Humans. When he was choosing music for his TV show, he remembered the effect Gounod's piece had on him. Through Hitchcock's program, the music achieved its widest audience.

=== Books ===
A series of literary anthologies with the running title Alfred Hitchcock Presents was issued to capitalize on the success of the television series. One volume, devoted to stories that censors would not allow to be adapted for broadcast, was entitled Alfred Hitchcock Presents: Stories They Wouldn't Let Me Do on TV—though eventually several of the stories collected therein were adapted.

- Alfred Hitchcock Presents: Stories They Wouldn't Let Me Do on TV. Dell, 1958.
- Alfred Hitchcock Presents: My Favorites in Suspense. Random House, 1959.
- Alfred Hitchcock Presents: A Baker's Dozen of Suspense Stories. Dell, 1963.
- Alfred Hitchcock Presents: Stories Not for the Nervous. Random House, 1965.
- Alfred Hitchcock Presents: 12 Stories for Late at Night. Dell, 1966.
- Alfred Hitchcock Presents: Stories That Scared Even Me. Random House, 1967.
- Alfred Hitchcock Presents: A Month of Mysteries. Random House, 1969.
- Alfred Hitchcock Presents: More Stories Not for the Nervous. Dell, 1970.

=== Board game ===
- Alfred Hitchcock Presents: Why. Milton Bradley, 1958.

=== LPs ===
In 1958, Imperial Records released Alfred Hitchcock Presents: Music to Be Murdered By.

Cover of Alfred Hitchcock Presents Ghost Stories for Young People (Golden Records 1962)

In 1962, Golden Records released a record album of six ghost stories for children titled Alfred Hitchcock Presents: Ghost Stories for Young People. The album opens with Gounod's theme music and is hosted by Hitchcock himself. He begins, "How do you do, boys and girls? I'm delighted to find that you believe in ghosts, too. After all, they believe in you, so it is only common courtesy to return the favor."

Hitchcock introduces each of the stories, all the while recounting a droll story of his own failed attempts to deal with a leaky faucet (which at the conclusion of the album leads to Hitchcock "drowning" in his flooded home). The ghost stories are read by actor John Allen with minimal sound effects and music. Allen wrote four of the stories:

1. "The Haunted and the Haunters (The Pirate's Curse)"
2. "The Magician ('Til Death Do Us Part)"
3. "Johnny Takes a Dare (The More the Merrier)"
4. Saki's "The Open Window" (special adaptation)
5. "The Helpful Hitchhiker"
6. Walter R. Brooks' "Jimmy Takes Vanishing Lessons"

=== Stage musical adaptation ===
On 1 August 2024, a stage musical adaptation of the series was announced as having its world premiere at the Theatre Royal, Bath, in March 2025, featuring music and lyrics by Steven Lutvak, book by Jay Dyer, and directed by John Doyle.

== Legacy ==
American rapper Eminem used the theme song in his song "Alfred's Theme" from his album Music to Be Murdered By – Side B (2020), which itself is one of two albums inspired by Hitchcock's 1958 spoken-word record of the same name.
