= Robert Stevens (director) =

American TV & film director, born 1920

- Born: December 2, 1920; New York City, U.S.
- Died: August 7, 1989 (aged 68); Westport, Connecticut, U.S.
- Occupations: Director, Producer
- Years active: 1948–1987
- Known for: Suspense; Alfred Hitchcock Presents; The Twilight Zone; Change of Mind

Robert Stevens (December 2, 1920 – August 7, 1989) was an American director and producer, primarily television, during a career of nearly four decades.

He was most active throughout the 1950s and 1960s on classic anthology TV shows. His most famous and notable works include his works as the producer/director of Suspense, as a frequent director of Alfred Hitchcock Presents and The Alfred Hitchcock Hour and as the director of the movie Change of Mind (1969). He also directed the pilot of The Twilight Zone, "Where Is Everybody?" (1959).

Work became slow for Stevens after the 1970s. His last work was as the director of an episode of Amazing Stories in 1987.

In 1989, Stevens was robbed and beaten in his rented Westport, Connecticut home where he had retired to in 1987. He died shortly thereafter of cardiac arrest on August 7, 1989, in Westport. He was 68 years old.

== Filmography ==
=== As director ===
Year	Title	Notes
1948	Talent Scout	1 episode
1949	Theatre of Romance	5 episodes
1949-1952	Suspense	105 episodes
1950	Starlight Theatre	1 episode
1953	Medallion Theatre	1 episode
1953	Willys Theatre Presenting Ben Hecht's Tales of the City	7 episodes
1954	The Mask	1 episode
1954-1955	Armstrong Circle Theatre	2 episodes
1954-1955	Justice	13 episodes
1955	Appointment with Adventure	2 episodes
1955-61	Alfred Hitchcock Presents	44 episodes
1957	The Big Caper	
1957	Climax!	1 episode
1957-58	Suspicion	4 episodes
1958	The United States Steel Hour	1 episode
1958	Never Love a Stranger	
1958	Rendezvous, later retitled Schilling Playhouse	1 episode
1959	The Twilight Zone	2 episodes
1959	General Electric Theater	1 episode
1959-60	Playhouse 90	6 episodes
1960	Startime	2 episodes
1960	Moment of Fear	1 episode
1962	I Thank a Fool	
1963	In the Cool of the Day	
1963-65	The Alfred Hitchcock Hour	5 episodes
1964	Breaking Point	1 episode
1964	The Great Adventure	1 episode
1964	The Ghost of Sierra de Cobre	TV movie
1964-1965	The Nurses	5 episodes
1965	For the People	1 episode
1965	The Defenders	2 episodes
1966	Journey Into Fear	1 episode
1966	The Long, Hot Summer (TV series)	1 episode
1966	Bob Hope Presents the Chrysler Theatre	1 episode
1967	Coronet Blue	1 episode
1968	Journey to the Unknown	2 episodes
1969	Change of Mind	
1975	Ladies of the Corridor	TV movie
1977	Vision	1 episode
1977	The Best of Families	TV miniseries
1987	Amazing Stories	1 episode

=== As producer ===
Year	Title	Notes
1949	Theatre of Romance	5 episodes
1949-1952	Suspense	102 episodes
1950	Starlight Theatre	1 episode
1954	The Mask	15 episodes
1955	Appointment with Adventure	1 episode
1960	Moment of Fear	7 episodes

=== As writer ===
Year	Title	Notes
1952	Suspense	2 episodes
1983	It's Not Easy	1 episode
