= Bernard C. Schoenfeld =

American screenwriter (1907–1990)

- Born: Bernard Cutner Schoenfeld; August 17, 1907; Brooklyn, New York City, U.S.
- Died: April 25, 1990 (aged 82); Guadalajara, Jalisco, Mexico
- Occupation: Screenwriter

Bernard Cutner Schoenfeld (August 17, 1907 – April 25, 1990) was an American screenwriter. He wrote for over twenty films and television series including Phantom Lady (1944), The Dark Corner (1946), Caged (1950), Macao (1952), There's Always Tomorrow (1956), and The Twilight Zone episode "From Agnes - with Love" (1964).
