= James Neilson (director) =

American television director (1909–1979)

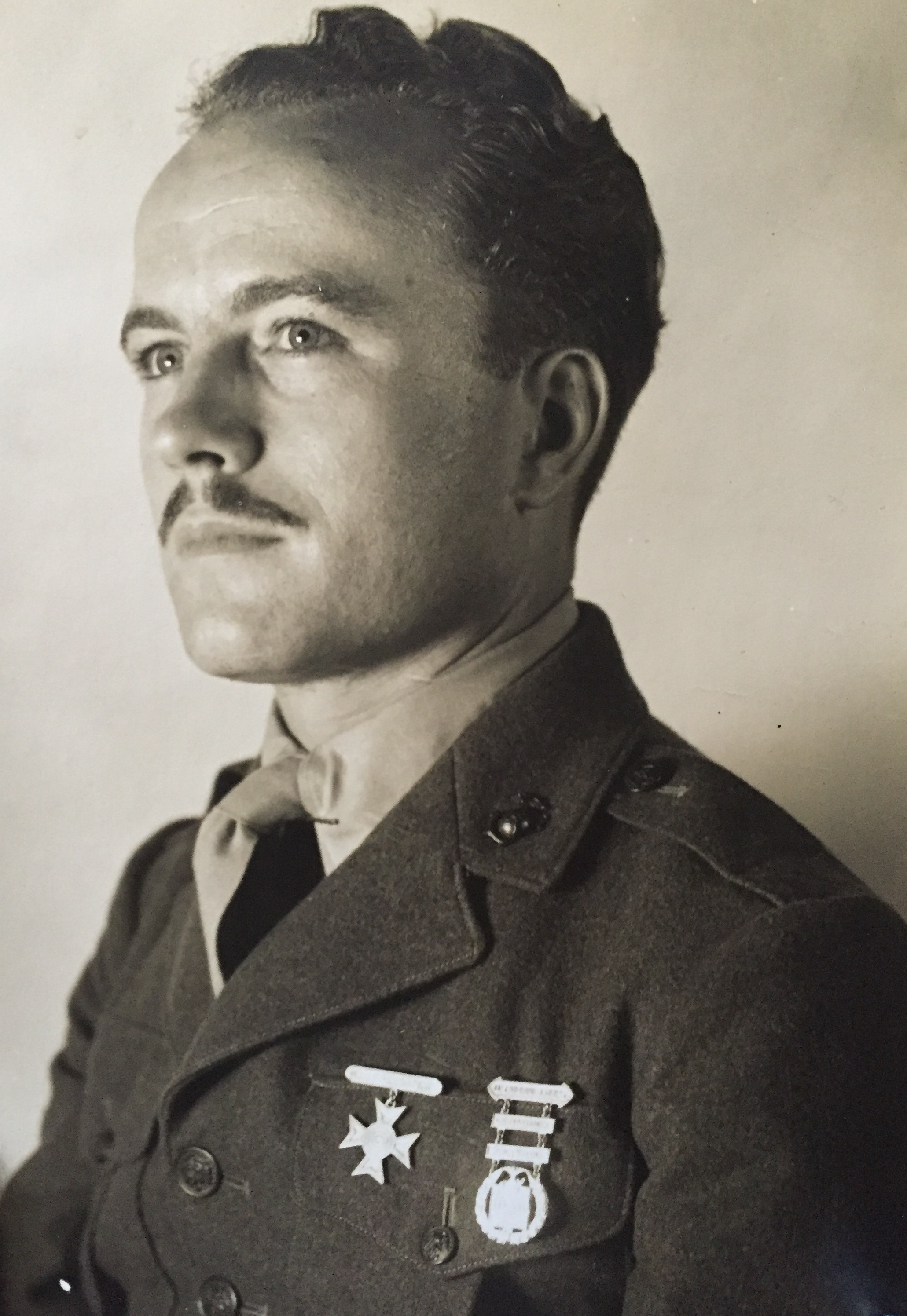
James Neilson USMC in 1943

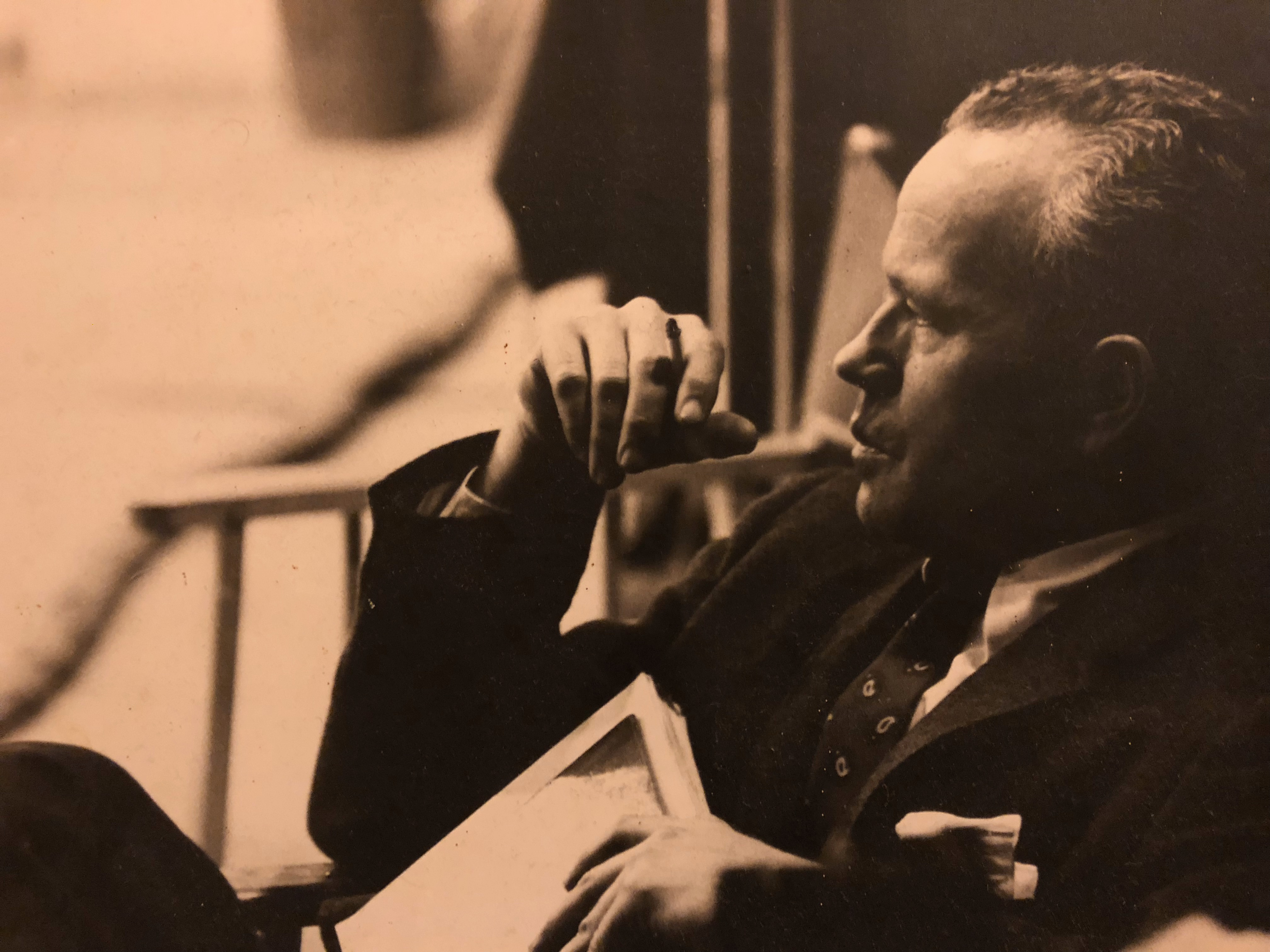
Director James Neilson in 1961

James William Neilson (October 1, 1909 – December 9, 1979) was an American television director, known for his stage and film direction as well as his work with Walt Disney's Wonderful World of Color.

== Directing ==
James W. Neilson was born in Shreveport, Louisiana, son of Edward Doremus and Clifford Bryant (née "Hall") Neilson and moved with his family to New York City as a child. In January 1942, Neilson enlisted in the U.S. Marine Corps directly following the entry of the United States into World War II. He served two tours of combat duty in the South Pacific and attained the rank of master sergeant. He was active as a war photographer.

Following the war, Neilson returned to the theatre and from 1948 to 1952, he directed numerous productions at the La Jolla Playhouse, many of which featured well-known Hollywood performers including Gregory Peck, Charlton Heston and Groucho Marx. His La Jolla Playhouse work and relationships helped him land an offer to direct for Columbia Pictures in 1952.

During the 1950s, 1960s, and 1970s, Neilson directed over 100 television episodes, including multiple episodes of dramatic series such as Adam-12, Ironside, Walt Disney's Wonderful World, Bonanza, Batman, Zorro, The Rifleman, Alfred Hitchcock Presents, and others.

Movies directed by Neilson include Dr. Syn, Alias the Scarecrow, The Moon-Spinners, Summer Magic, Gentle Giant, Bon Voyage!, The First Time, Where Angels Go, Trouble Follows,Moon Pilot and The Adventures of Bullwhip Griffin. The Western genre features frequently in Neilson's work, most notably the film Night Passage (1957) starring James Stewart.

Neilson's direction was nominated for a 1959 primetime Emmy Award for General Electric Theater.

He died in Flagstaff, Arizona, and is buried in Flagstaff's Citizens Cemetery.

== Other work ==
In addition to directing, Neilson's filmography includes credits for writing, on Wonderful World of Disney (1970), and for acting, on Perry Mason (1961). He is also credited with lighting design for numerous productions at the La Jolla Playhouse.
