= Carmen Mathews =

American actress (1911–1995)

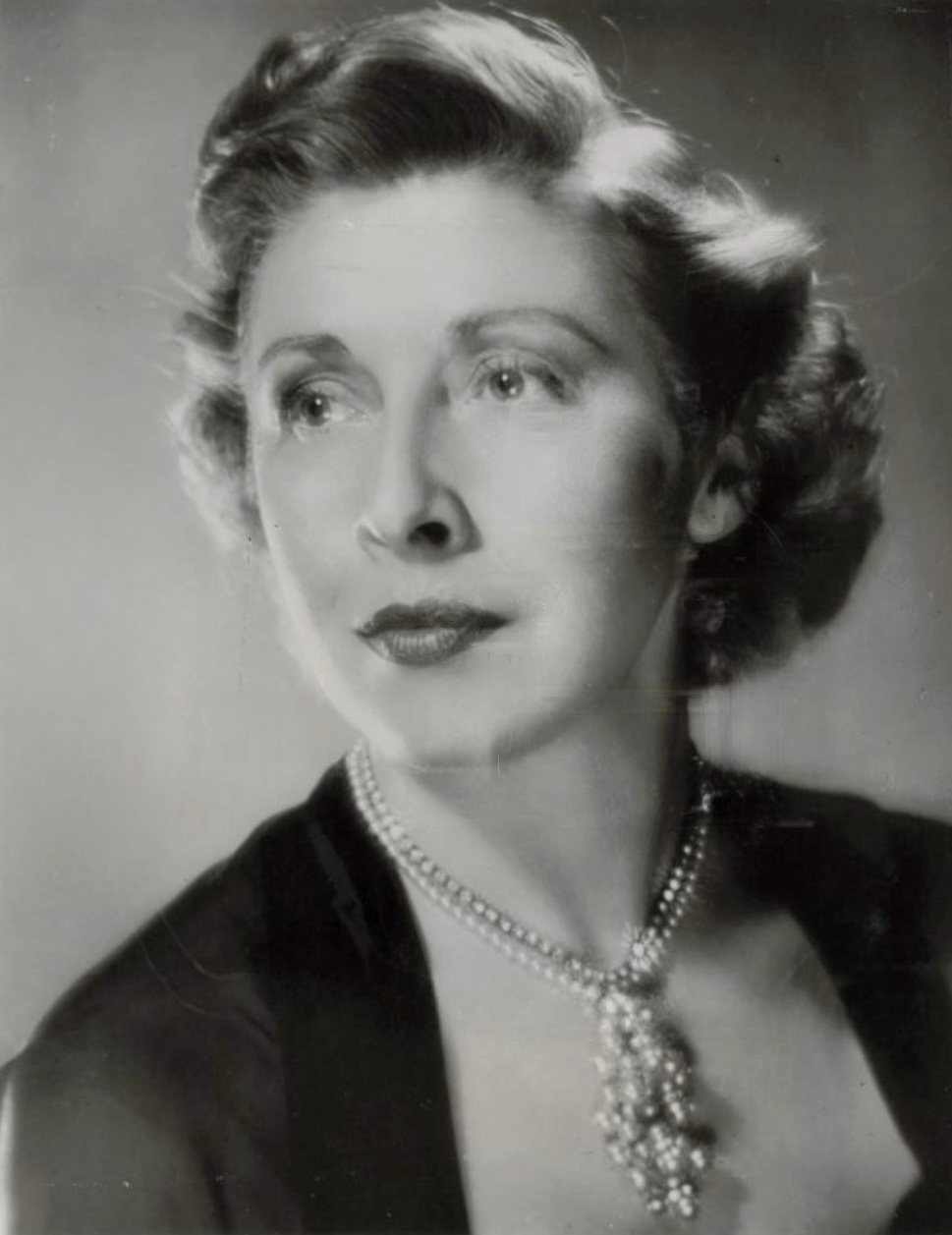
- Mathews in 1955
- Born: Carmen Sylvia Mathews; May 8, 1911; Philadelphia, Pennsylvania, U.S.
- Died: August 31, 1995 (aged 84); Redding, Connecticut, U.S.
- Occupations: Actress, environmentalist
- Years active: 1943–1992

Carmen Sylvia Mathews (May 8, 1911 – August 31, 1995) was an American actress and environmentalist.

== Biography ==
Mathews was born in Philadelphia. She studied first at Bennett Junior College and then in London at the Royal Academy of Dramatic Art for three semesters. She considered herself to be a "disciple" of Charles Rann Kennedy and Edith Wynne Matthison. She began her professional acting appearance with the Stratford-on-Avon Shakespearean Company before moving back to the United States. She described her parts there as "mostly furniture" with a few exceptions.

Matthews's career made little progress in the United States until Fall 1938 when she had the lady-in-waiting role in Maurice Evans's company of Hamlet. When Katherine Locke left the role of Ophelia in the Broadway production of Hamlet, Mathews replaced her and continued in that role when the play went on tour.

Her Shakespearean roles included Ophelia in Hamlet and the Queen in Richard II. She also starred as Theresa Tapper in the William Roos, Jack Lawrence, and Don Walker 1951 Broadway musical Courtin' Time. Her film credits include Butterfield 8 (1960), A Rage to Live (1965), Rabbit, Run (1970), Sounder (1972), Top of the Hill (1980) and Daniel (1983). On television, she performed on a variety of series over a span of four decades. A few of these series include appearances on six episodes of Alfred Hitchcock Presents (1955–65) as well as roles in a 1961 episode of The Twilight Zone, a 1964 episode of The Fugitive, and a 1972 episode of Cannon. One of her memorable televised performances is as Colonel Lilian Rayburn on Episode 150 of M*A*S*H. Toward the end of her career, in 1990, she was cast in the Last Best Year with Mary Tyler Moore and Bernadette Peters.

In 1975, Mathews set up and ran a residential summer camp for disadvantaged children on her 100-acre farm in Redding, Connecticut. Toward the end of her life, Mathews, a passionate environmentalist, made a perpetual donation of her 100-acre New Pond Farm to the Redding Land Trust, to ensure that it would retain its woods, fields, pond and marsh. The United Nations Association of the United States of America named Mathews one of Connecticut's outstanding women in 1987.

== Death ==
Mathews died at her farm in Redding, Connecticut in 1995, aged 84, from undisclosed causes.

== Filmography ==
Year	Title	Role	Notes
1956	Alfred Hitchcock Presents	Lizzie Borden	Season 1 Episode 17: "The Older Sister"
1956	Alfred Hitchcock Presents	Katherine Oldham	Season 2 Episode 4: "Kill With Kindness"
1956	Alfred Hitchcock Presents	Joanna Enright	Season 2 Episode 8: "Conversation Over a Corpse"
1958	Alfred Hitchcock Presents	Celia Boerum	Season 3 Episode 31: "The Festive Season"
1958	Butterfield 8	Mrs. Jescott	Uncredited
1959	Alfred Hitchcock Presents	Miss Hall	Season 4 Episode 28: "The Impossible Dream"
1961	The Twilight Zone	Vinnie	Episode: Static
1962	Alfred Hitchcock Presents	Thelma Malley	Season 7 Episode 28: "The Kerry Blue"
1965	A Rage to Live	Emily Caldwell	
1970	Rabbit, Run	Mrs. Springer	
1972	Sounder	Rita Boatwright	
1975	Ellery Queen	Laticia Alley	Episode 8: "The Mad Tea Party"
1978	M*A*S*H	Colonel Lillian Rayburn	Season 7, Episode 8:"Lil"
1980	Top of the Hill	Minna Ellsworth	TV movie
1980	Gauguin the Savage	Madame Jeanette	TV movie
1983	Daniel	Mrs. Ascher	
