= Alfred Hitchcock Presents season 3 =

Alfred Hitchcock Presents aired 39 episodes during its third season from 1957 to 1958, though only 38 were broadcast.
Alfred Hitchcock Presents was nominated for a Primetime Emmy Award for Best Dramatic Anthology Series at the 10th Primetime Emmy Awards on April 15, 1958.

No. overall	No. in season	Title	Directed by	Written by	Stars	Original release date
79	1	"The Glass Eye"	Robert Stevens	Story by : John Keir Cross; Teleplay by : Stirling Silliphant	Jessica Tandy as Julia Whitely, Tom Conway as Max Collodi, William Shatner as Jim Whitely	October 6, 1957
Jim Whitely (Shatner) tells his cousin Dorothy (Harris) a story about how their late extended cousin Julia (Tandy) fell in love with ventriloquist Max Collodi (Conway) immediately after his introduction by the emcee (Welch). Julia was so devoted that she traveled all over the country to watch Collodi's act with his child-sized dummy, "George". At first, she traveled with a child that she lovingly babysat, Allan (Playdon), but then she began going herself. She even quits her job in order to follow Collodi around the country. After writing many letters, an old man (Campbell) gives Julia a letter from Collodi finally allowing her to meet Collodi in person, though she receives only five minutes and is retain some distance from him. She purchases a fancy hat from a saleslady (Hitchcock) to help her look closer to the age of herself in a picture sent to him, and she gets the meeting location details from the hotel manager (Gould-Porter). Upon meeting him, however, she discovers that "Collodi" was the dummy, and the puppet was the real man (Barty), wearing a mask. Julia took with her "Collodi"'s glass eye as a keepsake of her love and fled, never to return. Supporting Cast: Rosemary Harris as Dorothy Whitely, Billy Barty as George, Paul Playdon as Allan, Arthur Gould-Porter (credited as A.E. Gould-Porter) as Hotel Manager, Pat Hitchcock as Saleslady, Nelson Welch as Emcee, Colin Campbell as Old Man, Herschel Graham as Ticket Clerk (uncredited), Lillian O'Malley as Theatre Patron (uncredited), Jack Deery as Theatre Patron (uncredited), Kenner G. Kemp as Theatre Patron (uncredited), Oliver Cross as Theatre Patron (uncredited), King Lockwood as Theatre Patron (uncredited), Lulu Mae Bohrman as Theatre Patron (uncredited) On April 15, 1958 this episode won the Primetime Emmy Award for director Robert Stevens for Best Direction, Half Hour or Less at the 10th Primetime Emmy Awards.
80	2	"Mail Order Prophet"	James Neilson	Story by : Antony Ferry; Teleplay by : Robert C. Dennis	E. G. Marshall as Ronald J. Grimes, Jack Klugman as George Benedict	October 13, 1957
Ordinary clerk Ronald J. Grimes (Marshall) starts receiving letters from a mysterious Jay Christiani that seemingly predict the future. His boss (Christy) is quite annoyed at Grimes receiving letters marked 'personal', as the office prefers all correspondence to be opened before its destination. While at their favorite restaurant, the waiter Tony (Romito) serves them while they debate whether to follow the advice, as more letters have since arrived. Grimes' friend George Benedict (Klugman) advises caution based on the law of averages, but Grimes starts investing money to great success after watching a fight correctly predicted, especially as a customer (Watkins) helps him understand how the fight-game works. After making $1000 in bets on Christiani's tips, Grimes sends Christiani a check for $200, despite George's protests. For Christiani's last tip, Grimes steals office funds ($15,000) to invest in the stock market (100,000 shares) when the secretary (Townsend) isn't looking and earns enough ($140,000) to retire comfortably in The Bahamas, even after returning the office money and paying Christiani's share. Afterward, George investigates Christiani with the postal inspector (Pratt) and discovers that he is a con man, as the letters were sent out to thousands of people using different predictions; Grimes just happened to receive a correct series of predictions. Supporting Cast: Victor Romito as Tony the Waiter, Ken Christy as Boss, Barbara Townsend as Secretary, Judson Pratt as Postal Inspector, Linda Watkins as Customer in Bar, Ralph Brooks as Office Worker (uncredited), Rudy Germane as Restaurant Patron (uncredited), Don Ames as Bar Patron (uncredited)
81	3	"The Perfect Crime"	Alfred Hitchcock	Story by : Ben Ray Redman; Teleplay by : Stirling Silliphant	Vincent Price as Charles Courtney, James Gregory as John Gregory	October 20, 1957
1912. Lawyer John Gregory (Gregory) meets with famous detective Charles Courtney (Price), who prides himself on never being wrong. Courtney has keepsakes from every case that he has solved, ranging from clocks to pistols. Gregory has evidence that Courtney convicted the wrong man, a Wall Street investor named Harrington (Dana), in a recent case and threatens to expose him. Courtney flashes back to the case in question, starting with the housekeeper (Lyon) finding Ernest West's (Gordon) dead body. After allowing Courtney to state his case and fluff his own ego, Gregory outlines how the murderer was Ernest's estranged younger wife, Alice (Stewart), as Gregory even witnessed her drop the gun on a trip in Davos. Alice and Harrington were having an affair, and Ernest refused to give her a divorce. Courtney strangles Gregory to death and uses his body to create a ceramic trophy in tribute of what he considers to be "the perfect crime", which he shows off to reporters (Webster, Nicholson) and a photographer (Zaremba) two years later (1914) after returning from a safari.; Supporting Cast: Gavin Gordon as Ernest West, Marianne Stewart as Alice West, Mark Dana as Harrington, John Zaremba as Photographer, Chuck Webster as Reporter, Nick Nicholson as Reporter, Therese Lyon as West's Housekeeper
82	4	"Heart of Gold"	Robert Stevens	Story by : Henry Slesar; Teleplay by : James Cavanagh	Mildred Dunnock as Martha Collins, Darryl Hickman as Jackie Blake, Nehemiah Persoff as Ralph Collins	October 27, 1957
When convicted nineteen-year-old robber Jackie Blake (Hickman) is released from prison, he is warmly accepted into the home of Martha Collins (Dunnock), mother of Jackie's former cellmate Allie. Martha treats Jackie motherly, makes him feel quite comfortable, and even invites him to stay in her house, but her other son, Ralph (Persoff) likes to put him down. Jackie's parole officer, Mr. Brown (Binns), holds hopes that Jackie will be successful, as he is an expert mechanic. Jackie has hopes of making a new honest life, but Jackie is attacked at his workplace by thugs (Lesser) who believe that he has the $150,000 in loot from a previous robbery hidden somewhere, and Jackie is found by a little girl (Callaway). Mr. Brown travels to the Collins home to tell Jackie and Martha that it is forbidden to have a parolee stay with the family of a prisoner, but Martha convinces Brown to look the other way. It is revealed that Martha and Ralph (Persoff) only took Jackie in because they want to force Jackie to reveal its whereabouts, as the thugs were sent with Ralph. When Ralph personally attempts to attack Jackie, Jackie stabs him to death in self-defense. When Jackie tries to defend his actions to Martha, she finally tells him the truth behind her kindness to him. We last see Martha run screaming for help, and we can presume Jackie was arrested again and returned to prison, whether the self-defense claim he most likely pleaded was accepted or not. Supporting Cast: Edward Binns as Mr. Brown, Len Lesser as Thug, Cheryl Callaway as Little Girl
83	5	"Silent Witness"	Paul Henreid	Story by : Jeanne Barry; Teleplay by : Robert C. Dennis	Don Taylor as Donald "Bob" Mason, Dolores Hart as Claudia Powell, Pat Hitchcock as Nancy Mason	November 3, 1957
Professor Donald "Bob" Mason (Taylor) works to end his affair with his student and mistress, Claudia Powell (Hart), after his students leave at the end of class. Mason wants to work on being closer to his wife Nancy (Hitchcock). Claudia is babysitting next door and Nancy leaves for a social function. Claudia wants Mason to divorce his wife so that they can get married, and when he rejects her desire, she threatens to ruin him forever. Mason then strangles Claudia to death when she refuses to end their affair. The only witness is Linda, the baby that Claudia was babysitting at the time. Police Sergeant Waggoner (Bellaver) questions Mason about Claudia the next day. Mrs. Davidson (Shirley) talks with Mason about her inability to sleep and desire to have her husband, Captain Davidson (Boyett), home from West Germany. Afterward, every time Linda sees Mason, she starts crying, which makes Mason fear that she will identify him once she starts talking. He sneaks over to the Davidson home, as Linda is being left on the covered back porch to sleep, but she sees him and starts crying, making him run as Mrs. Davidson is alerted. The next morning, a policewoman (Warren) is watching Linda outside as Mason leaves for work. When asked for help by a student (Davitt) after class, Mason hallucinates and sees Claudia's face instead. Mason ends up confessing to Sergeant Waggoner, but it turns out that Linda cries whenever she sees any man, as shown when her father returns from the military. Supporting Cast: Harry Bellaver as Police Sergeant Waggoner, William Boyett as Captain Davidson, Mercedes Shirley as Mrs. Davidson, Katherine Warren as Policewoman, Theodora Davitt as College Student
84	6	"Reward to Finder"	James Neilson	Story by : F.J. Smith; Teleplay by : Frank Gabrielson	Jo Van Fleet as Anna Gaminski, Oskar Homolka as Carl Gaminski	November 10, 1957
After finding a cash-laden wallet filled with $5200, street cleaner Carl Gaminski (Homolka) and his wife Anna (Fleet) talk of what to do, as Anna pushes to call the police while Carl wants to keep it. When a police officer (Akins) visits them regarding the collecting of money for a fund, Anna asks the officer about the legality of finding money. Carl lies to Anna and says that there was no reward for the money, but he never actually returned it, instead hiding it in the attic. When Anna finds it two weeks later, they begin to constantly fight over Anna's lavish spending of the money. The conflict climaxes when Carl bludgeons Anna to death with a statuette before drinking the cup of poisoned coffee that Anna had prepared for him. Supporting Cast: Claude Akins as Cop, Robert Whiteside (credited as Robert Whitesides) as Boy
85	7	"Enough Rope for Two"	Paul Henreid	Story by : Clark Howard; Teleplay by : Joel Murcott	Jean Hagen as Madge Griffin, Steven Hill as Joe Kedzie, Steve Brodie as Maxie	November 17, 1957
Ex-con Joe Kedzie (Hill) and his former partners Madge Griffin (Hagen) and Maxie (Brodie) drive to an abandoned mine in the middle of the Mohave Desert in order to collect hidden robbery loot totaling $100,000, as recently released Joe is the only one who knows where the money was placed ten years prior. Joe kept his mouth shut and protected banker Maxie and lover Madge, so he offers Maxie just ten years' worth of salary ($25,000) as his cut. On the way, they stop and Joe buys items, including a revolver, from a storekeeper (Hix) in Barstow. Maxie sees Joe buy the gun and worries that Joe knows that Madge and he turned Joe in to the police. Once there, the three turn on each other: Joe shoots and kills Maxie at the mine entrance, and Madge traps Joe down in the mine once she has obtained the money. This leaves Madge with the loot, but the keys to the car are in the mine with Joe, who is doomed with a broken leg suffered in the fall down the forty-foot mine shaft. Madge can only die slowly in the blistering sun while Joe dies in the cool, dark mine. Supporting Cast: Don Hix as Storekeeper
86	8	"Last Request"	Paul Henreid	Story by : Helen Fislar Brooks; Teleplay by : Joel Murcott	Harry Guardino as Gerry Daniels, Cara Williams as Mona Carstairs, Hugh Marlowe as Bernard Butler	November 24, 1957
While awaiting his execution, inmate Gerry Daniels (Guardino) argues with the warden (Kruger) and chaplain about being condemned because of a lying witness. Gerry types a final letter to the local newspaper, the Star-Times, protesting the incompetence of District Attorney Bernard Butler (Marlowe). Gerry flashes back to meeting Butler and their mutual hostility. Gerry admits to manipulating women frequently, as he holds great contempt for them. He picked a special choice in Nancy Judson (Lea), wife of traveling businessman Harry (Carson). When they go to her residence for a night cap, Harry suddenly appears and slaps Nancy. Gerry shoots Harry and Nancy with Nancy's revolver, killing both instantly. Feeling lucky, Gerry bets on a horse with bookie Clark (Morse), but he loses and is threatened for $500 owed. He is then extorted by the waitress, Mona Carstairs (Williams), who saw him with Nancy the night before, so he kills her as well. Mona's abusive ex-husband Frank (Ross) received the death penalty for her murder. Gerry then begins a relationship with Sheila Raymond (Booth), but his good time is interrupted by bookie Clark. Gerry extorts Sheila for the money, which is his alibi for the time of the murder for which he was convicted, which was Clark's death. Sheila had denied any relationship, which destroyed Gerry's alibi. Gerry confesses that he had murdered a total of three people, but Butler had never suspected him for those incidents; instead Gerry was only prosecuted for the murder that he did not commit, that of Clark. The execution is canceled when Butler gets new evidence exonerating Gerry from the incorrect charge, but Gerry's letter has already been read for censorship in the warden's office. Supporting Cast: Karin Booth as Sheila Raymond, Bob Carson (credited as Robert Carson) as Harry Judson, Jennifer Lea as Nancy Judson, Mike Ross as Frank Carstairs, Robin Morse as Clark, Fred Kruger as Warden
87	9	"The Young One"	Robert Altman	Story by : Phillip Goodman and Sandy Sax; Teleplay by : Sarett Rudley	Carol Lynley as Janice, Vince Edwards as Tex	December 1, 1957
Wild teenager Janice (Lynley) pushes her boyfriend Stan (Joyce) to get her alcohol from the bartender (Marlowe) and take her away from her caring guardian, Aunt Mae (Nolan). Janice wants to return to the mansion where she was born, as her parents were servants living in the servants' quarters. When eighteen-year-old Stan leaves, Janice befriends Tex (Edwards), a drifter through town, and tells him that she wants to leave town with him. The next night, she invites him to her aunt's house in order to frame him for the murder of Aunt Mae. However, Stan found Aunt Mae's body and knows that Jan committed the murder, so Sheriff Matt (Lane) arrests her instead. Supporting Cast: Jeanette Nolan as Aunt Mae, Rusty Lane as Sheriff Matt, Stephen Joyce as Stan, Frank Marlowe as Bartender
88	10	"The Diplomatic Corpse"	Paul Henreid	Story by : Alec Coppel; Teleplay by : Robert C. Dennis	Peter Lorre as Detective Thomas Salgado, George Peppard as Evan Wallace, Mary Scott as Janet Wallace	December 8, 1957
Married couple Evan (Peppard) and Janet Wallace (Scott) drive to Tijuana with her English aunt Mrs. Tait (Elsom) at the elderly woman's insistence. Upon arriving, and even after all are visually approved by the border inspector (Cassel), architect Evan and Janet discover that Mrs. Tait has died of a heart attack. They inquire with a cantina proprietor (Navarro) about the availability of a doctor. While Evan and Janet are searching for a doctor, their car is stolen with Mrs. Tait's corpse in it. After finding no luck with local police Chief Herrera (Verros), they hire detective Thomas Salgado (Lorre) for 150 pesos ($20) to find the car and, later, the body (for 300 additional pesos). While waiting, Chief Herrera finds the car, but with no body inside. Salgado reports that his thief friend, Rafael (Rodriguez), knows the body's location, but he must be bailed out of jail for $10. Later Salgado reports to the annoyed couple that the body is at a funeral home, and he takes their last $22. When Evan and Janet finally return home, they find out from Dr. Elliott (Lewis) that Salgado has given them the wrong body, and they cannot inherit the estate of £30,000. Supporting Cast: Isobel Elsom as Mrs. Tait, John Verros as Police Chief Miguel Herrera, Orlando Rodriguez as Rafael, Harrison Lewis as Doctor Elliott, George Navarro as Cantina Proprietor, Sid Cassel as Border Inspector
89	11	"The Deadly"	Don Taylor	Story by : Lawrence Treat; Teleplay by : Robert C. Dennis	Phyllis Thaxter as Margot Brenner, Lee Phillips as Jack Staley, Craig Stevens as Lee Brenner	December 15, 1957
Margot Brenner (Thaxter) and friends Myra Herbert (McCay), Rhoda Forbes (Shaw), and Mildred (Muse) talk about the troubles of fellow friend Ann Warren (Mayo). Lee (Stevens), Margot's husband, says that the problems are with her new husband. When the Brenner's have plumbing problems in their new home in the city of North Park, they call plumber Jack Staley (Phillips), who secretly has been blackmailing housewives for fabricated dalliances throughout the suburban neighborhood. Staley sets his sights on new target Margot while Lee is away at work. He seems to take an interest in the house's design and decoration but is really building up a stockpile of information to use for extortion. When he tries to charge her $500 and reveals his successes with Myra and Ann, she tries to have him arrested by undercover Police Sergeant Thompson (Gerstle), but Staley smells out the attempt and plays dumb, and Thompson seems to believe long-time local resident Staley. In retaliation, Margot gathers all the wives (Hughes, Harrison, Hayes) of the neighborhood to confront Staley together. United, the women blackmail Staley into performing housework for them in the value of the money that he has extorted from them, and more. Supporting Cast: Frank Gerstle as Police Sergeant Thompson, Anabel Shaw as Rhoda Forbes, Peggy McCay as Myra Herbert, Jacqueline Mayo as Ann Warren, Margaret Muse as Mildred, Sally Hughes as Lady, Deidre Harrison as Lady, Marietta Hayes as Lady
90	12	"Miss Paisley's Cat"	Justus Addiss	Story by : Roy Vickers; Teleplay by : Marian Cockrell	Dorothy Stickney as Emma Paisley, Orangey as Stanley	December 22, 1957
While preparing dinner, Emma Paisley (Stickney) is surprised by the appearance of an orange tabby cat, which she names Stanley (Orangey). She offers to pay her landlord, Bob Jenkins (Tyler) to offset the no-pets policy, but he only wishes to warn her that Stanley has been seen coming out the brutish downstairs tenant Rinditch (Graham)'s apartment. Stanley is such a tough survivor he even attacks a larger dog, which impresses the dog's walker (Armstrong). One day, when she finds Stanley's collar in the alley, she becomes distressed when Jenkins informs her that Mr. Rinditch, a mean bookie, killed Stanley, as he had previously warned he would do if the cat kept breaking into his apartment. Emma blacks out and wakes up four hours later, only to find that Rinditch has been murdered. She is informed by a neighbor (Sheeler) that landlord Jenkins has been arrested for the murder. Emma confesses to Police Inspector Graun (Bailey) and a note-taking officer (Smith) that she did it, but she is unable to convince them as she cannot explain the exact circumstances or lack of evidence indicating her involvement. Jenkins was arrested while trying to hide Rinditch's bag of money, as Jenkins spoke often of Rinditch's money. She finally does remember the chain of events after six months, but Jenkins has already been executed. Supporting Cast: Fred Graham as Rinditch, Raymond Bailey as Inspector Graun, Harry Tyler as Bob Jenkins, David Armstrong as Man Walking Dog, Joel Smith as Note-taking Policeman, Mark Sheeler as Shabby Neighbor
91	13	"Night of the Execution"	Justus Addiss	Story by : Henry Slesar; Teleplay by : Bernard C. Schoenfeld	Pat Hingle as Warren Selvy, Georgann Johnson as Doreen Selvy	December 29, 1957
Warren Selvy (Hingle), a prosecuting attorney with a long history of acquittals, is criticized by his father-in-law and boss, Sidney (Hayworth). Warren finally delivers a guilty verdict in a crucial murder case against a man named Rodman (Schaff) and famed defense attorney Hank Vance (Jackson), impressing the judge (Marlowe), bailiff (Julian), jurors (Murray), and spectators (Perrin). Sidney also tells Warren that Warren's wife Doreen (Johnson) seems unhappy and unfulfilled, as she wants Warren to be elected to higher political office. Afterward, Warren is confronted by a homeless man, Ed Barnes (Collins), who claims to be the actual murderer and presents knowledge of the case. Warren tries to scare him off, but when that fails, Warren tries to grab a clock that Ed attempts to smash, but accidentally hits Ed with it, killing him. Sidney and Doreen arrive immediately afterward, and Sidney tells Warren that Ed has a history of confessing to crimes that he did not commit, especially murder. Supporting Cast: Russell Collins as Ed Barnes, Vinton Hayworth as Sidney, Harry Jackson as Hank Vance, Edward Schaff as Rodman, Frank Marlowe as Judge, Murray Julian as Bailiff, Ben McAtee, Ed Spencer, Alfred Tonkel, Jack Perrin as Man Exiting Courtroom (uncredited), Forbes Murray as Juror (uncredited), Oliver Cross as Bar Patron (uncredited), Arthur Tovey as Bar Patron (uncredited)
92	14	"The Percentage"	James Neilson	Story by : David Alexander; Teleplay by : Bernard C. Schoenfeld	Alex Nicol as Eddie Slovak, Nita Talbot as Louise Williams	January 5, 1958
Successful businessman Eddie Slovak (Nicol) has a good life with his wife, Faye (Mathews), but is haunted by his past. He once acted cowardly in the Korean War and seeks out his old Army buddy Pete Williams (Keefer) under the pretense of fixing his television, as it is Pete who knows his secret. Pete repeatedly rebuffs Eddie's attempts to pay him back for covering for cowardice, much to Eddie's frustration. Eddie offers anything, but Pete only desires to take his wife Louise (Talbot) to a fancy restaurant and a night out on the town, so Eddie attempts to talk Louise into letting him help Pete. Louise agrees, as she is impressed by Eddie's notorious reputation. Upon returning home one night, Eddie is confronted by his mob boss (King) about his obsession with Pete and his lack of proper handling of financial accounts. Eddie places $20,000 in Pete's bank account, but Pete sends the money back. Eddie begins an affair with Louise, as she says that she only loved the uniform, not Pete. One night, Eddie is triggered by a picture of Pete in his Army uniform, he loses his mind, and he strangles her. When Pete comes home to screaming neighbors (O'Malley, Barnard), Eddie begs him to tell the police that a prowler was responsible, but Pete refuses, and when the officer (Ford) arrives, Pete tells them the truth. Eddie is arrested for murder, and this leaves Pete and Faye, who are lovers, the ability to be together. Supporting Cast: Carole Mathews as Faye Slovak, Don Keefer as Pete Williams, Walter Woolf King as Mob Boss, Lillian O'Malley as Neighbor, Ralph Barnard as Neighbor, Fritz Ford (credited as Frederick Ford) as Police Officer
93	15	"Together"	Robert Altman	Story by : Alec Coppel; Teleplay by : Robert C. Dennis	Joseph Cotten as Tony Gould	January 12, 1958
At an office Christmas party, worker Shelley (White) asks boss John Courtney (Wynn) to use his phone to call her boyfriend, Tony Gould (Cotten), as she wants Tony to confront his wealthy wife Gloria (MacAfee) for a divorce. Tony gets advice from close friend Charlie (Buffington) before meeting with his mistress, Shelley, in his office after hours. When Shelley threatens to expose their relationship to Tony's wife over the phone then and there, he stabs her to death but is unable to leave because the office is locked and Shelley's key snaps while in the lock. He attempts to get the broken key to fall from the other side of the lock and slide it under the door, but the key fails to slide. Tony calls his friend Charlie to help, but Charlie drunkenly leaves the phone off the hook to go party with his neighbors (Gibbons and Green). The next day, Tony attempts to communicate with a person in an adjacent building and breaks her window, and the police (Eldredge and Logan) are called. They break into the office and Tony almost escapes, but his drunken friend Charlie arrives and discovers the body in his office restroom. Supporting Cast: Christine White as Shelley, Sam Buffington as Charlie, George Eldredge as George the Police Lieutenant, Gordon Wynn as John Courtney, Florence MacAfee as Gloria Gould, Frank Logan (credited as Frank Allocca) as Frank the Policeman, Sanford Gibbons as Party Guest, Bonnie Green (credited as Bonne Green) as Party Guest
94	16	"Sylvia"	Herschel Daugherty	Story by : Ira Levin; Teleplay by : James Cavanagh	Ann Todd as Sylvia Leeds Kent, John McIntire as John Leeds	January 19, 1958
John Leeds (McIntire) is concerned when his daughter, Sylvia (Todd), purchases a revolver. As John is soon to travel to Europe, he has servant Bertha (Angold) watch over Sylvia, but Sylvia orders Bertha on three weeks mandatory vacation. John then seeks counsel with Sylvia's psychiatrist, Dr. Jason (Bailey). Sylvia's unscrupulous ex-husband, Peter (Reed), once left her because of forging a check of John's, and he has returned to town at Sylvia's request. John fears that Sylvia wants to kill Peter, so he pays Peter off with $25,000 so that he leaves again. Sylvia accuses John of never letting her have something of her own, including a husband, which is why she bought the gun. She then shoots and kills John for thwarting her attempt to reunite with Peter. Supporting Cast: Raymond Bailey as Dr. Jason, Philip Reed as Peter Kent, Edit Angold as Bertha
95	17	"The Motive"	Robert Stevens	Rose Simon Kohn	Skip Homeier as Tommy Greer, William Redfield as Richard	January 26, 1958
Crime-obsessed best friends Tommy (Homeier) and Richard (Redfield), along with Richard's girlfriend Sandra (Phillips), drunkenly discuss Tommy's theory that motiveless murders cannot be solved. In order to prove this theory, Tommy decides to murder a random person that Richard picks out from a Chicago phone book while a woman (West) impatiently waits. After sobering up, Richard calls the victim's home, telling the housekeeper (Stewart) that he is monitoring the watching of television programming by viewers. Richard visits when the two can be alone, having the victim, chemical engineer Jerome Stanton (Betz), answer various questions, before Richard kills him with a hammer. After the murder is done, the bellboy (Clarke) brings Richard a newspaper, and Tommy discovers that the Stanton is the man that Tommy's ex-wife Marian had left him for, thusly Tommy does have a motive; Richard picked him on purpose for revenge, as Tommy had once stolen the same woman from Richard. They end up in a fight that is interrupted by the police (Clark and Johnson), who arrest Tommy. Supporting Cast: Carl Betz as Jerome Stanton, Carmen Phillips as Sandra, Ken Clark as Plain Clothes Policeman, Gary Clarke as Bellboy, Kay Stewart as Housekeeper, Jennifer West (credited as Tharon Crigler) as Woman near Phone Books, Jim Johnson as Uniformed Police Officer
96	18	"Miss Bracegirdle Does Her Duty"	Robert Stevens	Story by : Stacy Aumonier; Teleplay by : Marian Cockrell	Mildred Natwick as Millicent Bracegirdle	February 2, 1958
1907. Elderly Englishwoman and London native Millicent Bracegirdle (Natwick) talks with husband Dean Septimus (Muir) and friends Mrs. Crump (Denham) and Maude (Purdom) of her upcoming trip to Bordeaux, France to pick up her ailing sister, as she has not left England in forty-five years. Upon arriving at 2:00 in the morning, she is greatly relieved when the maid (Clark) speaks English to help calm her nerves. While traveling in France, she accidentally locks herself in the wrong Paris hotel room with a man, so she hides under the bed. After getting progressively colder, she eventually gathers the nerves to confront the man, only to learn that he is dead. She eventually manages to escape, but she returns when she realizes that she left her belongings in the room. The garçon (Carrier) finds the man, but she manages to hide herself. She learns from the maid that the dead man is an accused murderer who had died of a heart attack, and the garçon slyly returns her sock to her.; Supporting Cast: Gavin Muir as Dean Septimus Bracegirdle, Vera Denham as Mrs. Crump, Tita Purdom as Maude, Albert Carrier as Garçon, Arlette Clark (credited as Arlette Clarke) as Maid
97	19	"The Equalizer"	James Neilson	Story by : C.B. Gilford; Teleplay by : Robert C. Dennis	Leif Erickson as Wayne Phillips, Martin Balsam as Eldon Marsh, Norma Crane as Louise Marsh	February 9, 1958
Accountant and treasurer Eldon Marsh (Balsam) talks with friend Charlie Harris (Manlove) after finishing a round of golf. Eldon then attends a party with his boss, Mr. Sloan (Riordan), who insist on playing bridge with Eldon and Ed Sobel (Maxwell). Eldon can't help but notice that new salesman Wayne Phillips (Erickson) is hitting it off with Eldon's wife Louise (Crane), and Wayne talks quite openly about his attraction to Louise and Jean Sobel (Cartwright), Ed's wife. Wayne has an affair with Louise to spite Eldon, who had confronted Wayne about his focus on Norma. After Charlie and another company employee (Gibbons) talk about Wayne's dalliances in the locker room in front of Eldon, Eldon publicly confronts Wayne in front of club patrons (Flowers, Carruthers, Harris, Deery, Miller, Haskett, Pollack) by throwing drinks on him, and Wayne knocks Eldon out cold. Eldon loses his wife and also his job when he refuses to leave it be. With nothing to lose, Eldon challenges the much stronger Wayne to a gun duel. Wayne agrees but shoots Eldon without warning. When the police (Watkins and McClure) investigate, they find that Eldon wasn't carrying a gun, and Wayne is charged with murder. Supporting Cast: Dudley Manlove as Charlie Harris, Paul Maxwell as Ed Sobel, Lynn Cartwright as Jean Sobel, Robert Riordan as Mr. Harvey Sloan, Frank Watkins as Police Officer, Tipp McClure (credited as Jack McClure) as Police Officer, Robert Gibbons as Company Employee and Club Patron, Bess Flowers as Club Patron (uncredited), Steve Carruthers as Club Patron (uncredited), Sam Harris as Club Patron (uncredited), Jack Deery as Club Patron (uncredited), Harold Miller as Club Patron (uncredited), Ed Haskett as Club Patron (uncredited), Murray Pollack as Club Patron (uncredited)
98	20	"On the Nose"	James Neilson	Story by : Henry Slesar; Teleplay by : Irving Elman	Jan Sterling as Fran Holland	February 16, 1958
Gambling-addicted housewife Fran Holland (Sterling) rushes to raise $25 to pay a bookie, Mr. Cooney (Opatoshu), before her husband Ed (Swenson) comes home. Fran got addicted to gambling while hanging out with Lila Shank (Watkins), who often visits the racetracks, but she tells Ed that she is done gambling, as Ed has threatened to leave her if she doesn't stop. Fran uses various tactics to get the money, including pretending to be need bus money and asking various men (Hughes, Baucom) for change. She tries to entrap an elegant lady (Rogers) but is rejected. At a shop, she steals a compact when the saleslady, Miss Reid (West), goes to answer the telephone, but she is stopped by the store detective (Betz). He forces her to ride in his car so that he can take advantage of her, even giving her $20 for services to be rendered, but she manages to force an accident in order to escape. She nearly gets in trouble when the police (Ragan) arrive to her home, as she left her purse at the scene of the accident, but they merely return her purse, and she even returns the stolen compact to them. She just manages to pay off the debt in time to Mr. Cooney before Ed returns home. She promises to never gamble again, but after receiving a telephone call from Ed about taking a business trip to Washington, soon after succumbs to temptation and places a new bet on a horse named Washington Flyer. Supporting Cast: Karl Swenson as Ed Holland, Linda Watkins as Lila Shank, David Opatoshu as Mr. Cooney, Jennifer West (credited as Tharon Crigler) as Miss Reid the Saleslady, Carl Betz as Store Detective, Mike Ragan as Detective, J. Anthony Hughes as Man at Bus Stop, Bill Baucom as Man at Bus Stop, Sondra Rogers as Elegant Lady
99	21	"Guest for Breakfast"	Paul Henreid	Story by : C.B. Gilford; Teleplay by : Robert C. Dennis	Joan Tetzel as Eve Ross, Scott McKay as Jordan Ross, Richard Shepard as Chester Lacey	February 23, 1958
Eve (Tetzel) and Jordan (McKay) Ross's marriage is on the rocks, and their morning argument is interrupted when gun-wielding Chester Lacey (Shepard) breaks into their home. Jordan believes the man to be Eve's lover but is quickly made aware of the man's mental and emotional instability. Lacey is on the run for two murders (his estranged wife and her lover) and needs a hostage. Eve and Jordan try to convince Lacey to kill the other, each trying to outbid the other regarding their potential helpfulness for Lacey's escape. When Lacey is about to kill Eve, Jordan intervenes to save her, and Eve helps her husband subdue Lacey. After Lacey is arrested, the couple discuss their reasoning for helping each other, and both seem open to reconciliation.
100	22	"The Return of the Hero"	Herschel Daugherty	Story by : Andrew Solt; Teleplay by : Andrew Solt and Stirling Silliphant	Jacques Bergerac as Sergeant Andre Doniere, Susan Kohner as Therese	March 2, 1958
France. Cafe owner Leon (Van Rooten) argues with local Fernaud (Sokoloff) about his state of drunkenness before talking with waitress and daughter Therese (Kohner) about showing favoritism to her "Uncle" Fernaud. Therese is upset about her wartime love interest Sergeant Andre Doniere (Bergerac) returning home without her, as Andre is a veteran traveling home with his friend Corporal Marcel Marchand (Dalio), who saved his life in the French-Algerian War. Therese speaks of her love for Andre, while he sees her as a mere wartime distraction. Marcel is courted by his love interest, Cherie (Scott), who wants to the two to stay. Andre despairs over his situation while cafe employee Jeanette (Lenay) plays the accordion for patrons (Barber). Marcel bets local butcher Francois (Granger) ten thousand francs that Andre is the son of a wealthy aristocratic countess, Countess d'Auberge (Castiglioni). Marcel gets Francois to make a phone call to Andre's aristocratic family, winning the bet but angering Andre. Andre finally agrees to speak to his family, asking if they will accommodate his friend, who lost his leg. Andre's mother, stepfather (Varconi), and fiancée Sybil Delamont (Chauvin) are wholly uninterested in welcoming a cripple to their home, with only sister Lili (Castillo) being friendly without any reservations. Andre decides to never return home, because he is the one who lost his leg. He tells Therese to marry Francois the butcher and leaves the cafe alone, but she runs after him. Leon momentarily stops her, but Fernaud threatens him to let her go, and Leon relents, allowing Therese to finally be with her love. Supporting Cast: Luis Van Rooten as Leon, Vladimir Sokoloff as Uncle Fernaud, Marcel Dalio as Corporal Marcel Marchand, Michael Granger as Francois, Gloria Castillo as Lili, Lilyan Chauvin as Sybil Delamont, Victor Varconi as Count d'Auberge, Karen Scott as Cherie, Iphigenie Castiglioni as Countess d'Auberge, Karen Lenay (as Caren Lenay) as Jeanette, Bobby Barber as Cafe Patron (uncredited)
101	23	"The Right Kind of House"	Don Taylor	Story by : Henry Slesar; Teleplay by : Robert C. Dennis	Robert Emhardt as Mr. Waterbury, Jeanette Nolan as Sadie Grimes	March 9, 1958
Mr. Waterbury (Emhardt) visits Ivy Corners real estate agent Aaron Hacker (Tyler) and his secretary Sally (O'Hara), who pretend to be busy in order to impress Waterbury. Waterbury wants to buy the house owned by elderly Sadie Grimes (Nolan), despite her demanding a price ($50,000) five times the house's worth. Grimes tells Waterbury how her son Michael (Drury) was killed by an unseen figure in that house over stolen loot from a robbery, and the loot was never found. She found out about Michael's criminal activity from Police Chief Joe Tyler (Watts) and Detective Sergeant Singer (Maxwell). Grimes put the house on the market to trap the killer, because only the killer would agree to the exorbitant price for the sake of the loot. Waterbury confirms her suspicion, but he soon dies because Grimes has poisoned his lemonade. Supporting Cast: Paul Maxwell as Detective Sergeant Singer, James Drury as Michael Grimes, Harry Tyler (credited as Harry O. Tyler) as Aaron Hacker, Charles Watts as Police Chief Joe Taylor, Jamie O'Hara as Sally
102	24	"The Foghorn"	Robert Stevens	Story by : Gertrude Atherton; Teleplay by : Frank Gabrielson	Barbara Bel Geddes as Lucia Clay, Michael Rennie as Allen Bliss	March 16, 1958
Twenty-six-year-old Lucia Clay (Bel Geddes) is haunted by the sound of a foghorn and cannot recall why, though she is comforted by a nun (Howard) and a doctor (Henry). She pieces together memories of dancing with fiancée John St. Rogers (Robinson) before falling in love with Allen Bliss (Rennie), a married man, over discussions of their shared interest in the fog. Only a butler's (Jackson) interruption concerning a phone call from Bliss' wife stopped their fantasy of escaping to a tropical island paradise. During a fog-filled evening later on, they ran into each other and decided to eat at local Wong's (Yip) Chinese restaurant, where they discussed Lucia leaving John. They shared poetry before Lucia told Allen that she is leaving him due to familial pressure, but Allen declared his love and asked for her hand in marriage. Allen was killed in a boat trip that they took together when a liner crashed into them in thick fog. To Lucia this happened only a few days ago, but in actuality 50 years have passed, and she falls dead when she sees herself in the mirror. Supporting Cast: Bartlett Robinson as John St. Rogers, William Yip as Wong the Restaurant Owner, Selmer Jackson as Butler, Jennifer Howard as Nun, Mark Henry as Doctor
103	25	"Flight to the East"	Arthur Hiller	Story by : Bevil Charles; Teleplay by : Joel Murcott	Gary Merrill as Ted Franklin, Patricia Cutts as Barbara Denim	March 23, 1958
While traveling on a plane from Nairobi to Cairo, war correspondent Ted Franklin (Merrill) strikes up a conversation with fellow passenger Barbara Denim (Cutts). Franklin is under arrest and is traveling with Cairo Police Inspector Kafir (Welles) on the way home to be tried for a murder. He flashes back to the trial of Sasha Ismael (George) and the convincing arguments of prosecutor Sir Robert Walton (Clanton) regarding Sasha's supposed weapons smuggling. He tells Denim a story of being an innocent newsman who argued with his bureau manager (Stephens) over writing articles about Sasha's innocence and was fired and deported. He said that he was trying to get information from a misguided and angry father, Abdul Ismael (Shayne), who lost his son Sasha to execution by hanging over stolen jewels, and he accidentally killed Abdul in a struggle in front of a witness (Ruskin). Once he has told her his story, Franklin learns that Denim is a witness who is going to testify against him, as she expertly breaks down his story to reveal that he pursued the grief-stricken father over the jewels after promising to get the guilty son released, if paid a portion. Supporting Cast: Anthony George as Sasha Ismael, Konstantin Shayne as Abdul Ismael, Mel Welles as Cairo Police Inspector Kafir, Ralph Clanton as Sir Robert Walton, Harvey Stephens as European Bureau Manager, Joseph Ruskin as Man Entering Shop (uncredited), Antic Melkior as Man (uncredited) Interesting Note: Patricia Cutts (September 6) and Konstantin Shayne (November 15) both died in 1974, while Anthony George (March 16) and Mel Welles (August 19) both died in 2005, respectively.
104	26	"Bull in a China Shop"	James Neilson	Story by : C.B. Gilford; Teleplay by : Sarett Rudley	Dennis Morgan as Detective Dennis O'Finn, Estelle Winwood as Miss Hildy-Lou	March 30, 1958
Homicide detective Dennis O'Finn (Morgan) lives next door to a group of elderly women (Winwood, Corby, Patterson, Moore) who are smitten with him. He is first introduced to them when responding to their call about a fifth elderly resident (Miss Elizabeth) who has died, but he only tells them to call a doctor for her "natural death". The lab technician (Maxwell) informs O'Finn that the cause of death is arsenic poisoning, so he must return to determine of the death was accidental. O'Finn figures out that Miss Hildy-Lou (Winwood) murdered the two other ladies solely so that O'Finn will visit them for the murder investigation. O'Finn, horrified to learn of their motive, transfers to the arson department, only for the remaining ladies to set their house on fire when Detective Kramer (Downing) informs them of his job change. Supporting Cast: Ellen Corby as Miss Samantha, Elizabeth Patterson as Miss Bessie, Ida Moore as Miss Birdie, Joe Downing (credited as Joseph Downing) as Detective Kramer, Paul Maxwell as Lab Technician
105	27	"Disappearing Trick"	Arthur Hiller	Story by : Victor Canning; Teleplay by : Kathleen Hite	Robert Horton as Walter Richmond, Betsy von Furstenberg as Laura Gild	April 6, 1958
Insurance investigator Walter Richmond (Horton) develops a relationship with Laura Gild (von Furstenberg), the widow of former client Herbert Gild (Bailey). Tennis enthusiast Walter is summoned by his bookie boss Regis (Albertson) about Herbert's disappearance, as he is a well-liked client. Laura claims that Herbert died in a sailing accident but fails to mention that the body was never found. Walter goes to speak with a friendly newspaperman (Helton) about Herbert's supposed death, as Regis demands a more in-depth investigation. Walter and Laura begin dating, and they decide to take a trip to Tijuana. Walter talks with old friend Julio (Lopez) about Herbert possibly being in Tijuana. Walter discovers that Herbert faked his death to get away from Laura, and he and Herbert agree to $10,000 cash to forget finding Herbert. Upon leaving, Walter finds that Laura has been following him. Laura wants more money, however. When Herbert confronts Walter and Laura with a gun, Walter is shot non-fatally and Herbert is knocked out. A doctor (Wilde) and nurse (Lord) bandage up Walter while Laura absconds from both men with the money. Walter loses his new love and the ability to play tennis ever again. Supporting Cast: Raymond Bailey as Herbert Gild, Frank Albertson as Regis, Perry Lopez as Julio, Percy Helton as Newspaperman, Joe Conley as Insurance Agent, Dorothea Lord as Nurse, Thomas Wilde (credited as Thomas Wild) as Doctor Note: An actor who spoke multiple lines at the beginning of the episode is uncredited and currently unknown.
106	28	"Lamb to the Slaughter"	Alfred Hitchcock	Roald Dahl	Barbara Bel Geddes as Mary Maloney	April 13, 1958
Pregnant housewife Mary Maloney (Bel Geddes) bludgeons her police officer husband Patrick (Lane) to death with a frozen leg of lamb when he says that he is going leave her to marry another woman. Mary puts the leg of lamb in the oven to cook and calls her friend Molly to cancel plans. She then goes to the store before returning to stage the scene for the police. Police Lieutenant Jack Noonan (Stone) arrives to handle the investigation, questioning Mary. Assistant Mike (Clark) arrives with inspector Sam (Waldis), a police photographer (Wilde), and a fingerprint officer (Keene), just before a forensic doctor (Ross) shows. Jack and Mike believe the scene to be staged, as Patrick didn't pull his gun, there is only one blow on his body, and he was known to be fooling around with women. When the police investigate, they are unable to find the clublike murder weapon, and Mary gives them the cooked leg of lamb to eat for supper. Supporting Cast: Allan Lane as Patrick Maloney, Harold J. Stone as Lieutenant Jack Noonan, Otto Waldis as Sam, Ken Clark as Mike the Policeman Assistant, William Keene as Fingerprint Policeman, Robert C. Ross as Forensic Doctor, Thomas Wilde (credited as Thomas Wild) as Police Photographer In 2009, TV Guide ranked this episode #59 on its list of the 100 Greatest Episodes. This episode was nominated for two Emmy Awards at the 11th Primetime Emmy Awards on May 6, 1959: Alfred Hitchcock for Best Direction of a Single Program of a Dramatic Series Less Than One Hour and Roald Dahl for Best Writing of a Single Program of a Dramatic Series Less Than One Hour.
107	29	"Fatal Figures"	Don Taylor	Story by : Rick Edelstein; Teleplay by : Robert C. Dennis	John McGiver as Harold Goames, Vivian Nathan as Margaret Goames	April 20, 1958
Statistics-obsessed bookkeeper Harold Goames (McGiver) feels unimportant in the world and starts committing crimes in order to become "significant" after hearing from a shopkeeper (Booth) about the death of the local florist, whom he considered a friend despite having never spoken to him. After committing auto-theft of a city councilman's car and robbery of a shopkeeper for perfume, he murders his sister Margaret (Nathan) with rat poison and confesses his reasons to disbelieving Police Sergeant McBaine (Wood), who rules instead that Margaret died of natural causes due to food poisoning. For his last statistically significant act, Harold commits suicide. Supporting Cast: Ward Wood as Police Sergeant McBaine, Nesdon Booth as Shopkeeper
108	30	"Death Sentence"	Paul Henreid	Story by : Miriam Allen deFord; Teleplay by : Joel Murcott	James Best as Norman Frayne, Katharine Bard as Paula Frayne, Steve Brodie as Al Revnel	April 27, 1958
Norman Frayne (Best) grew up in an orphanage and feels undeserving of his wife Paula (Bard), especially as he has underperformed jobwise since his father-in-law boss' death. Al Revnel (Brodie), a man from Norm's past, arrives and blackmails Norm for $50,000 over a crime that they committed 12 years earlier in Missouri, as Al killed a night watchman and covered for Norm's fingerprints. Norm believes that Al, a degenerate gambler, is having an affair with Paula after a comment made by Police Chief Walt Haney (Gerstle), so he plans to blow them up with dynamite. When Paula insists that it is untrue, Norm lets himself be blown up so that Paula will be free from Al's threats and Norm's past, as Haney confirms to Paula before arresting Al for parole violation, meaning Al will serve his full life sentence. Supporting Cast: Frank Gerstle as Police Chief Walt Haney
109	31	"The Festive Season"	Arthur Hiller	Story by : Stanley Ellin; Teleplay by : James Cavanaugh	Carmen Mathews as Celia Boerum, Edmon Ryan as Attorney John, Richard Waring as Charlie Boerum	May 4, 1958
On Christmas Eve, attorney John (Ryan) visits the home of his estranged siblings Celia (Mathews) and Charlie Boerum (Waring). John criticizes Celia for keeping the house so dark and dreary. Charlie wants to kill Celia, whom he believes murdered his wife Jessie by tripping her down the stairs on Christmas Eve, but Celia protests her innocence and is determined to care for Charlie regardless of his feelings. John calls Celia out for despising Jessie and pleads with Celia to find a home elsewhere. Charlie has moved back into his childhood bedroom, desiring a place away from where his mother and sister would annoy him. He intimates that he will only leave after he kills Celia; he even threatens to kill Celia after she packs Jessie's belongings away. John leaves after making them promise not to hurt each other, but Celia trips down the stairs as a cord was strung by Charlie across the steps. Charlie blames Celia for being like his controlling and domineering mother, yet Celia claims that Charlie has always desired a strong maternal figure. John has been doing this every Christmas Eve since Charlie's wife's death 20 years ago. All he can do is have a drink with the local bartender Al (Baker) and hope for the best. Supporting Cast: Benny Baker as Al the Bartender
110	32	"Listen, Listen...!"	Don Taylor	Story by : R.E. Kendall; Teleplay by : Bernard C. Schoenfeld	Edgar Stehli as Herbert Johnson	May 11, 1958
Herbert Johnson (Stehli) tries to convince Police Sergeant Oliver (Lummis) that the third and final murder of the Stockings Murders was committed by a copycat, but no one takes him seriously. He is referred by Oliver to another precinct and Lieutenant King (Williams), who also doesn't believe him. He goes to tell a journalist but can only find the receptionist (Westmoreland) at the press ads, who sends him to a bar. There, the bartender (Barron) points out a journalist, Beekman (Herrman), whom Herbert tries to tell his belief about the last murder, but he is dismissed once again and flees once he becomes intoxicated. He even sees a similar appearance in one of the women in the bar, Slats (Loughery), to one of the victims. He next travels to a church, where employee Miss Andrews (Kelly) guides him past a churchgoer (Baker) to a priest, Father Rafferty (Lane). Rafferty finally listens to Herbert's story about how the victim, Helen Jameson, left her controlling, religious parents for a life of "sin", and her death was a "punishment". Herbert is Helen's father, and his wife (Evanson) is the copycat who killed Helen, but Herbert is unable to accuse his wife openly. Supporting Cast: Dayton Lummis as Police Sergeant Oliver, Adam Williams as Police Lieutenant King, Baynes Barron as Charlie the Bartender, Jackie Loughery as Slats, Kitty Kelly as Miss Andrews, Rusty Lane as Father Rafferty, Edith Evanson as Mrs. Johnson, Robert Herrman as Mr. Beekman the Journalist, Elsie Baker as Church Attendee, James Westmoreland (credited as Rad Fulton) as Receptionist in Press Ads
111	33	"Post Mortem"	Arthur Hiller	Story by : Cornell Woolrich; Teleplay by : Robert C. Dennis	Steve Forrest as Steve Archer, Joanna Moore as Judy Archer, James Gregory as Wescott	May 18, 1958
After being surprised by reporters (Fresco, Peterson, Martin) because her deceased husband Harry Mead had picked a horserace winner, Judy Archer (Moore) gets permission from the cemetery clerk (Ates) to exhume her first husband Harry's body because a winning sweepstakes ticket was buried with him worth $133,000. Insurance investigator Wescott (Gregory), pretending to be a reporter, takes advantage of this to perform an autopsy on Harry, proving that he was poisoned. Judy's second husband, Steve (Forrest), murdered Harry before marrying Judy so that they could live on Harry's insurance money, which is why Steve didn't want Harry's body exhumed. Wescott helps Judy catch Steve in a failed act of trying to murder her (by throwing a room heater in the bathtub), and Steve is arrested by a waiting police sergeant (Robbins) for murder and attempted murder. Supporting Cast: Roscoe Ates as Cemetery Clerk, Fred Robbins as Police Sergeant, David Fresco as Photographer, Edgar Peterson as Journalist, Patrick Martin as Journalist
112	34	"The Crocodile Case"	Don Taylor	Story by : Roy Vickers; Teleplay by : Robert C. Dennis	Denholm Elliott as Jack Lyons, Hazel Court as Phyllis Chaundry-Lyons	May 25, 1958
England. Jack Lyons (Elliott) and Phyllis Chaundry (Court) are married after Jack kills Phyllis' first husband Arthur (Gould-Porter), but Phyllis is unhappy because Jack is late to the party, which she explains to her sister Aileen (Hitchcock). Phyllis is also very upset when Jack tells her that he killed Arthur, but he explains that she would be an accomplice legally. She is finally upset that Jack left the crocodile dressing case that her late husband was returning to her on the night of his murder. The police arrive shortly afterward, with Inspector Karsiak (Alderson), Sergeant Rason (Sheridan), and a policeman (Conroy) handling the case. Jack and Phyllis spend time apart to avoid any suspicion by the authorities, but Phyllis continually contacts the police about the dressing case. When the police finally find the case in the possession of a thief named Dan Mintz (Worlock), a man who had worked for Jack once before and who Jack let's take the fall for the murder. However, Jack identifies the case based on the initials, but that gives away his guilt to Inspector Karsiak, because the initials were only placed on the case just before the murder. Supporting Cast: Pat Hitchcock as Aileen, Arthur Gould-Porter (credited as A.E. Gould-Porter) as Arthur Chaundry, John Alderson as Inspector Karsiak, Frederick Worlock as Dan Mintz, Dan Sheridan as Sergeant Rason, Laurence Conroy as Policeman
113	35	"Dip in the Pool"	Alfred Hitchcock	Roald Dahl	Keenan Wynn as William Botibol, Doreen Lang as Emily	June 1, 1958
While traveling on a cruise ship, William Botibol (Wynn) bets heavily in a betting pool on how many miles the ship travels every day, despite the facts that he perennially loses, that he cannot afford to match the stakes set by others such as the wealthy Mr. and Mrs. Renshaw (Bourneuf and Wray), and that his wife Ethel (Platt) begs him to not gamble. Despite being on limited financial grounds, he shows off by tipping the waiters (Hadlow, Graham) well and ordering around the steward (Harvey). William consults the ship's purser (Clanton) about the rules and seeks an insider's edge regarding information. An auctioneer (Cunningham) controls the bidding for mileage and the captain (Cowan) takes notes, with William outbidding others (Hughes, Curtis, Brian, Sardo) for the shortest amount of mileage covered per day. The ship enters a heavy storm system and slows considerably, with William getting information that the ship will continue to precede at that rate consistently. When the storm clears and the ship then goes faster than William expected, he decides to jump off the ship to force it to stop. He makes sure that a young woman, Emily (Lang), is there to see him jump, assuming that she will call for help. However, Emily is intellectually disabled and does not react excitedly after he jumps over the railing, leaving her mother (Lloyd) to ignore her. Supporting Cast: Louise Platt as Ethel Botibol, Fay Wray as Mrs. Renshaw, Philip Bourneuf as Mr. Renshaw, Doris Lloyd as Emily's Mother, Ralph Clanton as Ship's Purser, Ashley Cowan as Captain, Owen Cunningham as Auctioneer, Margaret Curtis as Passenger, Judith Brian as Passenger, William Hughes as Bidder, Barry Harvey as Steward, Michael Hadlow as Waiter, Herschel Graham as Waiter (uncredited), Cosmo Sardo as Ship Passenger (uncredited)
114	36	"The Safe Place"	James Neilson	Story by : Jay Wilson; Teleplay by : Michael Hogan	Robert H. Harris as George Piper, Joanne Linville as Millie Manners	June 8, 1958
Head bank teller George Piper (Harris) flirts with his love interest, Millie Manners (Linville), after speaking with his boss, branch manager Henry C. Farnsworth (Holmes). Piper wants to get serious with Millie, but Millie has heard that George is never that serious. Later that night, George's brother Fred (Paris) stops by George's home to warn him about waiting too long to settle down. Fred offers George a get-rich-quick scheme that actually looks intriguing, but they must act quickly. George murders one of the bank's dubious clients, gambler Victor Mannett (Pine), at Mannett's home to steal his $15,000, which George then hides in plain sight inside his teller drawer. The next day, fellow teller Mr. Martinson (Mondeaux) notices George's good mood before George is dressed down by boss Farnsworth for keeping the Mannett account, as the murder will ruin the bank's reputation. Farnsworth had been informed of doings by Police Sergeant Henderson (Karnes), who found the checkbook for the bank in Mannett's home. George, who has worked at the bank for over thirty years, is fired on the spot by Farnsworth and ordered to give up his teller drawer keys immediately, so he can never retrieve the money. Supporting Cast: Jerry Paris as Fred Piper, Phillip Pine as Victor Manett, Wendell Holmes as Henry C. Farnsworth, Robert Karnes as Police Sergeant Henderson, Joel Mondeaux as Mr. Martinson
115	37	"The Canary Sedan"	Robert Stevens	Story by : Ann Bridge; Teleplay by : Stirling Silliphant	Jessica Tandy as Laura Bowlby, Murray Matheson as James St. George Bernard Bowlby	June 15, 1958
Laura Bowlby (Tandy) travels to Hong Kong to join her husband, James (Matheson), who has been living there for business purposes. Laura has psychic abilities and often communicates with a Ouija board. The local bartender (Bernard) speaks with the steward (Harvey) about her abilities while a man (Strong) receives a reading from her. She is met by husband James upon the boat's arrival, and assistant Thompson (Muir) secures an automobile from dealer Mr. Nixon (Westwood). When she is inside her second-hand formerly canary yellow sedan, she can hear the disembodied voice of a French woman, a countess, talking to her lover "Jacques", although the driver, Chang (Levy), cannot. That night, Laura and James go to a party thrown by wealthy Mr. Adams (Cunningham) for James' business relations. Adams reveals background information about both the car and woman to Laura. Laura, envious of the woman's passionate affair and curious of her fate, further investigates her story after the countess states an address. She has Chang drive her there and speaks with an old man (Komai), who says that the lady has gone. When she peruses around the back garden, she finds an engraved stone and discovers that the countess was having an affair with Laura's husband, James. Supporting Cast: Gavin Muir as Thompson, Weaver Levy as Chang, Patrick Westwood as Mr. Nixon, Owen Cunningham as Mr. Adams, Tetsu Komai as Old Bearded Man, Barry Harvey as Steward, Barry Bernard as Bartender, Leonard Strong as Man using Ouija Board, James B. Leong
116	38	"The Impromptu Murder"	Paul Henreid	Story by : Roy Vickers; Teleplay by : Francis Cockrell	Hume Cronyn as Henry Daw, Robert Douglas as Inspector Charles Tarrant	June 22, 1958
England, 1916. Solicitor Henry Daw (Cronyn) greets his assistant Holsom (Frankham) before reviewing correspondence from a client, Miss Wilkinson (Lloyd), who is visiting shortly after nine years away. Henry and his sister Marjorie (Cossart) host Miss Wilkinson, who says that she needs to withdraw a substantial amount of money to invest in her brother's factory, which Henry cannot hope to accomplish as he has lost a good deal of the wealth. That night, Henry strangles Wilkinson and buries her under a slab of stone next to the river. He even dresses up in her clothing to stage leaving for the train station, which fools the inspector (Pelling), and speaks on the London-bound train with farmer Barclay (Worlock) to establish an alibi, as he has abandoned the clothing switch. Upon returning home, servant Lucy (Glessing) reports that Marjorie is ill and refuses to leave bed. Inspector Charles Tarrant (Douglas) investigates Wilkinson's disappearance by questioning Henry. A few days later, a public ceremony to honor the fallen in war is held, with special guests Colonel Sir Francis Garrold (Dvorak) and his wife (Watts). While Henry speaks, a body is found floating in the river, but Henry refuses to look at it or identify it properly, igniting Inspector Tarrant's suspicions. Tarrant demands that Marjorie be required to view the body as Henry failed to do so properly. Placed under pressure, Henry confesses to the murder, but it turns out that the body belongs to someone else. Supporting Cast: Doris Lloyd as Miss Wilkinson, David Frankham as Holsom, Frederick Worlock as Barclay, Gwendolyn Watts as Mrs. Garrold, Valerie Cossart as Marjorie Daw, Reggie Dvorak as Colonel Sir Francis Garrold, Molly Glessing as Lucy, George Pelling as Train Ticket Inspector
117	39	"Little White Frock"	Herschel Daugherty	Story by : Stacy Aumonier; Teleplay by : Stirling Silliphant	Herbert Marshall as Colin Bragner, Julie Adams as Carol Longsworth, Tom Helmore as Adam Longsworth	June 29, 1958
Elderly actor Mr. Andrus (Jerome) bores casting directors Adam Longsworth (Helmore) and Mr. Robinson (Robinson) before the two catch drinks at the local bar with Mr. Koslow (Waldis). Out-of-work senior stage actor Colin Bragner (Marshall) invites playwright Longsworth and his wife Carol (Adams) for dinner. He tells them a story about the love of his life, Lila Gordon (Mayo), who turned him down for his stage partner and friend Terry O'Bain (Dean) and then died tragically while making a child's dress. Adam and Carol are deeply touched by the story, but it turns out to be complete fiction — as revealed when servant Marie (Kelly) enters and identifies the dress as her niece's. Colin was merely showing off his acting skills in the hope of getting work. Adam is impressed and offers him a job on the spot. Supporting Cast: Bartlett Robinson as Mr. Robinson, Otto Waldis as Mr. Koslow, Kitty Kelly as Marie, Jacqueline Mayo as Lila Gordon, Roy Dean as Terry O'Bain, Edwin Jerome as Mr. Andrus, Joseph Hamilton (credited as Joe Hamilton) as Bill, Olan Soule as Stagehand (uncredited)
