= The Touch of Satan =

1971 horror film

- 1974 re-release poster
- Directed by: Don Henderson
- Written by: James E. McLarty
- Produced by: George E. Carey
- Starring: Michael Berry; Emby Mellay
- Cinematography: Jordan Cronenweth
- Edited by: Dick Elliott
- Music by: Robert O. Ragland
- Production company: Stupendous Talking Pictures International
- Distributed by: Futurama International Pictures
- Release date: February 16, 1972
- Running time: 90 minutes
- Country: United States
- Language: English

The Touch of Satan (also released as A Touch of Satan and Night of the Demon) is a 1971 American horror film directed by Don Henderson and starring Michael Berry and Emby Mellay in their debut roles. The film was shot in the summer of 1971 in the Santa Ynez, California area and featured early work by makeup artist Joe Blasco, cinematographer Jordan Cronenweth, and composer Robert O. Ragland.

Produced independently on a low budget, the film received a limited release by Futurama International Pictures in February 1972 under the title ''The Touch of Melissa''. The Touch of Satan was relatively obscure until a 1998 appearance on the series Mystery Science Theater 3000.

== Plot ==
A farmer is murdered by an elderly insane woman with a burned face. After stabbing the farmer and accidentally setting his barn on fire, the woman stumbles home to her family. The family, an older couple and a young woman, argue about the best way to handle the situation and make vague references that the elderly woman may have killed people in the past.

The scene then switches to the main character, a young man named Jodie who is on an open-ended car trip across America to find himself and discover whether or not he wishes to follow in his father's footsteps as a lawyer. Jodie stops at a small pond to have lunch and meets Melissa, the teenage girl from the previous scene. They banter briefly and she convinces him to come visit her family on their walnut farm, despite the intense distress this offer causes her parents. The young couple grows increasingly close, despite the frightening presence of the elderly woman and various clues dropped along the way that Melissa is, in fact, a 127-year-old witch and the birth sister of the elderly insane woman, whom she has told Jodie is her great-grandmother.

When the old woman murders a deputy policeman in front of Jodie, Melissa confesses that she is a cursed witch and is possessed by Satan. Jodie refuses to believe this, so Melissa reveals in a dream-sequence that her sister, Lucinda, was burned as a witch by an angry mob of villagers in the 19th century. Melissa was so distressed by the sight of her sister being burned at the stake that she offered her soul to Satan in order to gain the power to save her. Satan agreed and allowed Melissa to save Lucinda. Melissa was given eternal life and youth as a result of this bargain, but the gift was a curse as she watched her now-insane sister grow old and homicidal.

Lucinda tries to kill Jodie, but Melissa uses her powers to stop her, and Lucinda dies in a fire that she started. Jodie eventually believes Melissa and has sex with her, effectively "freeing" her from Satan. Unexpectedly, however, she instantly ages to her "actual" age, and Jodie sells his soul to Satan in order to restore Melissa's youth and save her life. The movie ends with the realization that each are bound to Satan and that Melissa's attempt to save herself has only managed to draw Jodie into the evil contract as well.

== Cast ==
- Michael Berry as Jodie Lee Thompson
- Emby Mellay as Melissa Strickland
- Lee Amber as Luther Strickland
- Yvonne Winslow as Molly Strickland
- Jeanne Gerson as Lucinda Strickland
- Robert Easton as Mr. Keitel
- Lew Horn as Deputy John Mason
- Sharon Crabtree as Young Lucinda
- John J. Fox as gas station attendant
- Hal K. Dawson as Mr. Gentry
- Frank Jansen as Frank Larsen
- Ellen Bailey as Sarah Strickland

== Production ==
The original title of the film was The Touch of Melissa. Joe Blasco did the makeup effects for the movie, his first feature. The cinematography was done by Jordan Cronenweth, who would later gain fame for his work on 1982's Blade Runner. At the time, Cronenweth had worked primarily as a camera operator for Conrad Hall. For years, rumors claimed that director 'Don Henderson' was a pseudonym for filmmaker Tom Laughlin (who sometimes used the alias 'Donald Henderson').

== Reception ==
The Monster Times's Larry Brill found it to be "interesting and effective."

The film had re-releases in 1974 and 1980, variously using the alternate titles The Curse of Melissa and Night of the Demon. In some territories, it was released on a double bill with Jesús Franco's Count Dracula (1970).

=== Mystery Science Theater 3000 ===
The film was featured on the movie-mocking show Mystery Science Theater 3000's episode #908, which first aired on the Sci-Fi Channel on July 11, 1998. Writer / performer Paul Chaplin calls the episode "Pause-ville," referring to the languid pace of dialogue and action in the movie. Chaplin also points out it's never made clear what the relationship between Luther and Molly, who operate the walnut farm, and the witch Melissa is.

== See also ==
- List of American films of 1971
