= Roy Vickers =

Roy Vickers may refer to:

- Roy Henry Vickers, Canadian artist
- William Edward Vickers, British mystery writer who used the pseudonym Roy Vickers
