= Gunsmoke in Tucson =

1958 film by Thomas Carr

- Theatrical release poster
- Directed by: Thomas Carr
- Screenplay by: Paul Leslie Peil; Robert L. Joseph
- Story by: Paul Leslie Peil
- Produced by: William D. Coates
- Starring: Mark Stevens; Forrest Tucker; Gale Robbins; Vaughn Taylor; John Ward; Kevin Hagen
- Cinematography: William P. Whitley
- Edited by: George White
- Music by: Sidney Cutner
- Color process: Color by DeLuxe
- Production company: Allied Artists Pictures
- Distributed by: Allied Artists Pictures
- Release date: December 7, 1958
- Running time: 80 minutes
- Country: United States
- Language: English

Gunsmoke in Tucson is a 1958 American CinemaScope Western film directed by Thomas Carr and written by Paul Leslie Peil and Robert L. Joseph. The film stars Mark Stevens, Forrest Tucker, Gale Robbins, Vaughn Taylor, John Ward and Kevin Hagen. The film was released on December 7, 1958, by Allied Artists Pictures.

== Plot ==
Two brothers on opposite sides of the law become embroiled in an Arizona range war between cattlemen and farmers. As young men, the two brothers are forced to watch their supposed horse thief father hung by a posse. After the hanging the two are run out of town and told not to return.

The older brother, John Brazos, becomes an Arizona Territory Marshal and the younger brother, Chip, becomes an outlaw.

== Cast ==
- Mark Stevens as Jedediah 'Chip' Coburn
- Forrest Tucker as John Brazos
- Gale Robbins as Lou Crenshaw
- Vaughn Taylor as Ben Bodeen
- John Ward as Slick Kirby
- Kevin Hagen as Clem Haney
- John Cliff as Sheriff Cass
- Gail Kobe as Katy Porter
- George Keymas as Hondo
- Richard Reeves as Notches Pole
- William Henry as Sheriff Will Blane (as Bill Henry)
