= John Ward (American actor) =

American actor, born 1923

- Born: June 11, 1923; New York City, New York, United States
- Died: March 23, 1995 (aged 71); Los Angeles, California, United States
- Occupation: Actor

John Ward (June 11, 1923 – March 23, 1995) was an American actor.

Ward was born in Los Angeles, California and was best known for such films and television series as PT 109, Baretta and The FBI.

== Partial filmography ==
- Space Master X-7 (1958) - (uncredited)
- Gunsmoke in Tucson (1958) - Slick Kirby
- Who Was That Lady? (1960) - Gibson (uncredited)
- The Twilight Zone, Season 4 Episode 16: "On Thursday We Leave for Home" (1963) - Colonist
- PT 109 (1963) - Radioman John Maguire
- Valley of the Dolls (1967) - Neely O'Hara's Psychiatrist (uncredited)
