= Jordan Cronenweth =

American cinematographer (1935–1996)

- Born: Jordan Scott Cronenweth; February 20, 1935; Los Angeles, California, U.S.
- Died: November 29, 1996 (aged 61); Los Angeles, California, U.S.
- Years active: 1962–1992
- Children: Jeff Cronenweth

Jordan Scott Cronenweth, ASC (February 20, 1935 – November 29, 1996) was an American cinematographer.

He was known for his work on the groundbreaking science fiction film Blade Runner (1982), which earned him the BAFTA Award for Best Cinematography, while also being credited for defining the cyberpunk aesthetic.

Additional accolades also include a nomination for the Academy Award for Best Cinematography for his work on Peggy Sue Got Married (1986).

== Early life and education ==
Cronenweth was born in Los Angeles.

His father was William Edward Cronenweth, a studio portrait photographer who worked with many famous actors during the Golden Age of Hollywood.

He graduated from North Hollywood High School before attending Los Angeles City College, where he majored in engineering.

== Career ==
While still in college, Cronenweth interned as a film lab assistant at Columbia Pictures and acted as a cameraman on the 1955 musical film Oklahoma!. Between 1961 and 1969, he was a camera assistant and later camera operator under Conrad Hall's guidance.

His early cinematography credits included Robert Altman's Brewster McCloud and the low-budget horror film The Touch of Satan. During the 1970s, Cronenweth worked on a variety of projects at varying budget levels, including The Front Page for director Billy Wilder, and the dark psychological thriller Rolling Thunder.

Cronenweth was initially hired as the director of photography for The Adventures of Buckaroo Banzai Across the 8th Dimension, but producers replaced him with Fred J. Koenekamp halfway through production.

Cronenweth also shot three concert films - Stop Making Sense (1984, featuring Talking Heads), Rattle and Hum (1988, featuring U2), and Get Back (1991, featuring Paul McCartney).

== Personal life ==
He and his first wife Carol had three children, Christie, Tim, and two-time Oscar-nominated cinematographer Jeff Cronenweth. Jordan Cronenweth's second marriage was to Shane Cronenweth for 17 years.

=== Illness and death ===
In 1978, Cronenweth was at first misdiagnosed with multiple sclerosis, and in 1981, he was diagnosed with Parkinson's disease.

Despite considerable physical challenges, Cronenweth continued working for another 13 years, until his condition caught up to him. On the tumultuous production of Alien 3, Cronenweth worked on the first six weeks before his health deteriorated. Leaving him unable to continue working, Alex Thomson was brought in as replacement.

Cronenweth died in 1996 at the age of 61.

== Legacy ==
A 2003 poll of his peers conducted by the International Cinematographers Guild placed Cronenweth among the ten most influential cinematographers of all time.

Allen Daviau called him "without question, one of the outstanding cinematographers of his generation."

== Filmography ==
Short film

Year	Title	Director	Notes
1969	A Christmas Memory	Frank Perry	Segment of Trilogy; With Vincent Saizis and Conrad Hall

Feature film

Year	Title	Director
1970	Brewster McCloud (Note: With Lamar Boren)	Robert Altman
1971	The Touch of Satan	Don Henderson
1972	Cry for Me, Billy	William A. Graham
1972	Play It as It Lays	Frank Perry
1974	The Nickel Ride	Robert Mulligan
1974	Zandy's Bride	Jan Troell
1974	The Front Page	Billy Wilder
1976	Gable and Lombard	Sidney J. Furie
1977	Handle with Care	Jonathan Demme
1977	Rolling Thunder	John Flynn
1980	Altered States	Ken Russell
1981	Cutter's Way	Ivan Passer
1982	Best Friends	Norman Jewison
1982	Blade Runner	Ridley Scott
1986	Just Between Friends	Allan Burns
1986	Peggy Sue Got Married	Francis Ford Coppola
1987	Gardens of Stone	Francis Ford Coppola
1990	State of Grace	Phil Joanou
1992	Final Analysis	Phil Joanou

TV movies

Year	Title	Director
1973	Birds of Prey	William A. Graham
1977	One in a Million: The Ron LeFlore Story	William A. Graham
1978	And I Alone Survived	William A. Graham
1979	Transplant	William A. Graham

Concert film

Year	Title	Director	Notes
1984	Stop Making Sense	Jonathan Demme	
1988	U2: Rattle and Hum	Phil Joanou	Colour segment
1991	Get Back	Richard Lester	With Robert Paynter

== Awards and nominations ==
Year	Award	Category	Title	Result
1982	British Academy Film Awards	Best Cinematography	Blade Runner	Won
1982	British Society of Cinematographers	Best Cinematography	Blade Runner	Nominated
1982	Los Angeles Film Critics Association	Best Cinematography	Blade Runner	Won
1982	New York Film Critics Circle	Best Cinematographer	Blade Runner	Nominated
1986	Academy Awards	Best Cinematography	Peggy Sue Got Married	Nominated
1986	American Society of Cinematographers	Outstanding Achievement in Cinematography	Peggy Sue Got Married	Won
