= The Nickel Ride =

1974 film

- Film poster
- Directed by: Robert Mulligan
- Written by: Eric Roth
- Produced by: Robert Mulligan
- Starring: Jason Miller; Linda Haynes; Victor French; John Hillerman; Bo Hopkins
- Cinematography: Jordan Cronenweth
- Edited by: O. Nicholas Brown
- Music by: Dave Grusin
- Distributed by: 20th Century Fox
- Release date: May 1974
- Running time: 99 minutes
- Country: United States
- Language: English
- Budget: $1.4 million

The Nickel Ride is a 1974 American neo-noir crime film directed and produced by Robert Mulligan and starring Jason Miller, Linda Haynes, Victor French, Bo Hopkins, and John Hillerman. It is the debut film of screenwriter Eric Roth. It was entered into the 1974 Cannes Film Festival, where it was nominated for the Palme d'Or.

== Plot ==
In Los Angeles, Cooper is a "key-man" (fence) for a local crime boss, operating a series of warehouses used as storage facilities for stolen and illicit goods. Cooper hopes to close a deal for a new block of storage units, bribing local realtor Elias O'Neil to broker a deal with city officials to sell him the warehouses. Elias tells Cooper that he needs more time, so Cooper gives him a week with an implicit threat of violent retaliation should he fail. Cooper is ordered by his boss Carl to fix a boxing match, after their resident fixer Paulie failed to get the fighters to take a dive. Carl meets with Paulie, who tells the former that he's lost his touch and wants out of the criminal underworld. Cooper volunteers to fix the fight on his behalf, and informs the boxer Tonozzi that if he doesn't take a dive, Paulie will be hurt. Tonozzi reluctantly agrees.

After a surprise birthday party, Cooper is taken by Carl and his bodyguard Bobby to one of the prospective warehouses, where he is ordered to finish the deal by Saturday. Carl introduces Cooper to Turner, a young punk dressed like a cowboy who is to be his protege in the underworld. A disgruntled Cooper returns to his birthday party, but is interrupted by Paulie's arrival, announcing Tonozzi won the fight. Begging Cooper to help him, Paulie is advised to leave town until Cooper can smooth things over with Carl. Cooper visits Elias at a barbershop to close the warehouse deal, but Elias demands another $15,000 for bribes. Cooper agrees to pay out another $10,000, but Elias questions his authority to do so as he heard rumors that Cooper is on the way out. Cooper meets Carl and gives him the weekly pay offs. As he gets in the elevator to leave, Bobby joins him and brags that he killed Paulie. Angered, he brutally beats Bobby and breaks two of his ribs in the process.

Cooper is driven to Carl's office by Turner, who is now Carl's driver following Bobby's hospitalization. At the office, Turner goes to the bathroom, allowing Cooper to slide a gun from his desk and hide it under his coat. Turner returns and asks questions about Cooper's days as a carnival barker, but Cooper does not answer and goes outside just as Carl drives up. Carl authorizes the extra $10,000 for the warehouse, but warns Cooper that he better have a "yes" by Saturday. He chastises Cooper for beating Bobby, stating that Cooper is the syndicate's "computer" and they cannot afford for him to break down.

Hoping to relax, Cooper and his girlfriend travel to a cabin in the woods. Things seem fine, until Sarah notices wet footprints inside the cabin and Cooper discovers his gun missing from a drawer. After searching the cabin and finding no one, Cooper buys new locks and a shotgun. That afternoon, Cooper drives to Elias's hotel, only to find he is not registered there. He telephones Elias, but gets no answer. Returning to the cabin, Cooper finds Turner waiting for the warehouse answer. Cooper responds that when he gets the answer, he will call Carl himself, and sends Turner away. After Turner leaves, Sarah demands to know what is going on, but Cooper will only say it is "business." Enraged, Sarah slaps Cooper, who then punches her in the face. Embarrassed, Cooper puts her on the bed, explaining that there are new people that want to take his job away, and without his work he is nothing.

As there is no telephone in the cabin, Cooper goes to a nearby bait shop and calls the hotel. Upon learning Elias never arrived, Cooper drives back to the cabin and falls asleep holding his shotgun. He dreams Turner is there, holding a rifle; Cooper aims his shotgun, causing Turner to drop the rifle, and scream that he only wants the "message." Cooper slugs him with the gun and, just as he is about to pull the trigger, Sarah appears, distracting Cooper long enough for Turner to grab the rifle and shoot Sarah. Cooper awakens and tells Sarah they have to return to the city. After dropping Sarah off, Cooper goes to Elias' house and learns that the deal has fallen through and that Carl already knows. Cooper puts Sarah on a train for Las Vegas, promising to join her later. He then finds Carl at a restaurant and threatens to kill him if he doesn't take the contract off his head. Carl insists that the mob cannot lose their "key man" and that they will find other warehouses.

At his home, Cooper is attacked by Turner with a gun. Cooper is shot multiple times, but manages to charge Turner, then beats him and strangles him to death. He collapses to the floor in exhaustion, and dies of his wounds.

== Cast ==
- Jason Miller as Cooper
- Linda Haynes as Sarah
- Victor French as Paddie
- John Hillerman as Carl
- Bo Hopkins as Turner
- Richard Evans as Bobby
- Bart Burns as Elias
- Lou Frizzell as Paulie
- Mark Gordon as Tonozzi
- Harvey Gold as Chester
- Lee de Broux as Harry
- Nelson Leigh (uncredited)

== Development ==
The project began with a screenplay written by Eric Roth called Fifty-Fifty which concerned a low-level crime boss who grows paranoid on the verge of his fiftieth birthday. The script was purchased by Chartoff-Winkler Productions with George C. Scott originally attached as the lead. The project then changed hands to producer/director Robert Mulligan, with 20th Century Fox committed as distributor. Mulligan selected the project as his follow-up to The Other after he had briefly been considered to direct Taxi Driver with Jeff Bridges in the starring role of Travis Bickle.

At the last minute, Scott dropped out of the project, and the role of Cooper was filled by Jason Miller, fresh off his acclaim for The Exorcist. Although considerably younger than the envisioned character, Miller's casting pleased Roth, who considered the actor "the new John Garfield."

Linda Haynes recalled being intrigued by the prospect of getting to work with Mulligan, whom she considered to be among the "crème de la crème" of Hollywood directors. Mulligan regulars Victor French and Lou Frizzell were cast in supporting roles.

== Filming ==
Filming took place from September 17 to November 13, 1973. The film was predominantly shot on location in downtown Los Angeles, with Big Bear used for the scenes set at the lakeside cabin and the Rosslyn Hotel used as Cooper's office and apartment.

Bo Hopkins recalled the difficulties of filming a driving scene with Jason Miller because the scene had been rewritten the night beforehand, giving him little time to memorize his lines. He "loved" Robert Mulligan as a director, and gave him credit for the handling of the climactic strangulation sequence, although Hopkins also admitted that it was tough scene to shoot and that the whole film was difficult to work on.

== Release and box office ==
The film premiered at Cannes to positive reception, being nominated for the Palme d'Or. It then was previewed in France, but poor box office there and in other European markets led to concerns about the project's commercial viability. Director Robert Mulligan cut the movie down, eliminating in the process the character of Cooper's younger brother Larry, played by Brendan Burns. (The actor's father, Bart Burns, played the role of Elias in the film.) According to Eric Roth, Burns attended the domestic premiere with surrounding family having not been informed that his character was cut out of the film. Despite his excision, Burns’ name still appears in some credits listings.

In January 1975, the film debuted domestically on the east coast, where it performed poorly despite the efforts to tighten the picture. In response, the marketing campaign was retooled before the film's gradual release to the rest of the U.S., but The Nickel Ride ultimately disappeared without finding a sizable audience. Due to the delayed and staggered release, the film did not arrive in some markets for a full year or more – Los Angeles received the film at the end of 1975, and one Seattle critic noted in a review published in January 1976 that the film was presented in his city as a "first-run second feature" in a double-bill with Robert Aldrich’s Hustle.

The film ultimately grossed less than $2 million domestically.

== Awards ==
- Nominee Palme d'Or - 1974 Cannes Film Festival (Robert Mulligan)

== Reception ==
Nora Sayre of The New York Times was not impressed:

The movie appears to be a drama of real estate. Jason Miller plays a neighborhood fixer who is attempting to lease a warehouse for the storage of stolen goods; however, the deal is delayed, and he's threatened by the minor hoods who are his clients. His role is a study in worry: the angst rarely leaves his deep-set lemur's eyes. We watch him worrying in profile, in full and three-quarter face, standing or sitting or lying down, in daylight and darkness, on the phone, in his office and out of doors. All in all, he seems more vulnerable to an anxiety attack than to an assailant's bullet...The Nickel Ride is handsomely filmed in bleak pastels, but the numerous close-ups manage to stress the slowness of the action, and quick cuts can't dispel the tedium.

Nick Pinkerton of The Village Voice was slightly more forgiving: "The Nickel Ride is a seldom-seen drama of white-collar workaday criminal drudgery to make you believe the best of '70s cinema will never fully be quarried out...The atmosphere is one of musty hallways, sour stomach, and looming late middle age with no retirement plan in sight."

Despite its elusiveness and initially mixed reaction, the film has attained a following, and it sometimes is compared favorably to The Friends of Eddie Coyle. Among its more prominent fans is director Quentin Tarantino, who included it in the line-up of his first annual QT Fest in 1997.
