= Latitude Zero (film) =

- Theatrical release poster
- Directed by: Ishirō Honda
- Screenplay by: Ted Sherdeman; Shinichi Sekizawa
- Story by: Ted Sherdeman
- Based on: Tales of Latitude Zero by Ted Sherdeman
- Produced by: Tomoyuki Tanaka; Don Sharp (uncredited)
- Starring: Joseph Cotten; Cesar Romero; Akira Takarada; Masumi Okada; Richard Jaeckel; Patricia Medina; Akihiko Hirata; Tetsu Nakamura; Linda Haynes
- Cinematography: Taiichi Kankura
- Edited by: Ume Takeda
- Music by: Akira Ifukube
- Production companies: Toho; Don Sharp Productions (uncredited)
- Distributed by: Toho (Japan); National General Pictures (U.S.)
- Release dates: July 26, 1969 (Japan); May 1970 (United States)
- Running time: 89 minutes (Japan); 106 minutes (U.S.)
- Countries: Japan; United States
- Language: English
- Budget: ¥289 million ($800,000)
- Box office: ¥170 million ($472,000)

Latitude Zero (緯度0大作戦, Ido Zero Daisakusen; lit. 'The Great Latitude 0 Operation') is a 1969 tokusatsu science fiction film directed by Ishirō Honda, with special effects by Eiji Tsuburaya. An international co-production of Japan and the United States, it stars Joseph Cotten, Cesar Romero, Akira Takarada, Masumi Okada, Richard Jaeckel, Patricia Medina, Akihiko Hirata and Linda Haynes. The film was written by Ted Sherdeman, based on his 1941 radio serial of the same name; the Japanese version also credits Shinichi Sekizawa as co-screenwriter.

== Plot ==
Three men—Dr. Ken Tashiro, Dr. Jules Masson, and journalist Perry Lawton—are trapped in a bathysphere due to seismic activity. They are rescued by the crew of the supersubmarine Alpha, captained by Craig McKenzie, who they learn is 204 years old (and that the Alpha was launched in 1805, from Stornoway, Scotland). McKenzie takes them to Latitude Zero to heal Dr. Masson's injuries. Along the way, they are attacked by a rival supersubmarine, the Black Shark, captained by Kuroiga, who works for McKenzie's 203-year-old rival, Dr. Malic. Using super-technology, McKenzie gives the Black Shark the slip.

The crew of the Alpha soon return to Latitude Zero, a super-advanced utopia hidden fifteen miles below sea level at the intersection of the Equator and the International Date Line, populated by people from all over the world reported missing in accidents at sea. It has existed since the 19th century, as none of its inhabitants age or die, and greed and political divisions plaguing the surface world are unknown here. It also surreptitiously assists mankind's technological and cultural advancement. Malic, however, wishes to destroy Latitude Zero using superweapons and artificially grafted monstrosities like giant rats and anthropomorphic bats. He kidnaps a Japanese physicist allied with McKenzie, Dr. Okada, and his daughter Tsuruko, and forces Okada to assist him in his schemes. Moreover, after a cruel experiment grafting the wings of a condor to a lion, he removes Kuroiga's brain and places it in the creature as punishment for her failures.

Upon receiving an emergency signal from Okada, McKenzie organizes a rescue expedition. Tashiro, Masson and Lawton, Latitude Zero physician Dr. Anne Barton, and Kōbo volunteer to help. Equipped with James Bond-style devices and rendered resistant to physical harm by a special bath, they infiltrate Malic's island base, Blood Rock, fight their way to the enemy control center, and rescue the Okadas. As the team escapes, Malic enters the Black Shark and fires an onboard laser at them, but Kuroiga turns against Malic and attacks the laser. The weapon collapses the island's cliffs onto the submarine, destroying it and killing everyone aboard.

Of all the visitors to Latitude Zero, only Lawton wishes to return home. He is picked up by a US Navy vessel and discovers that all his knowledge of Latitude Zero's existence has disappeared. Just as he is about to resign himself to the idea that his adventure never occurred, the ship receives a message stating that a cache of diamonds has been deposited in his name in a safe deposit box in New York City, and the ship is ordered to change course to Latitude Zero.

== Cast ==
- Joseph Cotten as Captain Craig McKenzie, Captain of "Alpha"/Commander Glenn McKenzie
- Cesar Romero as Dr. Malic, Scientist of Blood Rock/Lt Hastings
- Akira Takarada as Dr. Ken Tashiro, Oceanographer
- Masumi Okada as Dr. Jules Masson, Geologist
- Richard Jaeckel as Perry Lawton, Journalist
- Patricia Medina as Lucretia, Lover of Malic
- Kin Ōmae as Kōbo; Crew of "Alpha"
- Linda Haynes as Dr. Anne Barton, Doctor of Latitude Zero
- Tetsu Nakamura as Dr. Okada, Japanese atomic physicist
- Mari Nakayama as Tsuruko Okada; Daughter of Dr. Okada
- Akihiko Hirata as Dr. Sugata; Doctor of Latitude Zero
- Hikaru Kuroki as Captain Kuroiga ("Black Moth", Captain of "Black Shark")
- Susumu Kurobe as Chin; Crewman of "Black Shark"
- Andrew Hughes as Sir Maurice Poeley
- Haruo Nakajima as Griffin, Giant Rat, Bat Man
- Harekichi Nakamura, Yu Sekida as Bat Men
- Teruo Aragaki, Nakamura Harekichi as Giant Rats

== Production ==
=== Writing ===
In 1967, Toho was struggling to get two ambitious projects off the ground. One was an adaption of Sakyo Komatsu’s manga ESPY and the other was The Flying Battleship, a spiritual sequel to Atragon. That same year, Toho executive Masami Fujimoto went to America where he met with Don Sharpe, head of Ambassador Productions, about doing a series of co-produced special effects films. One of Sharpe’s projects was a film adaption of Ted Sherdeman’s NBC radio serial Latitude Zero, which Sherdeman had been trying to get adapted into film for the past several years.

Ted Sherdeman's radio serial with the same title, also known as Tales of Latitude Zero, was broadcast in 1941 by NBC. The first episode of Latitude Zero concerned three crew members of the old vessel “Hope,” who discover a futuristic submarine after surviving a storm in the Bering Sea near the Arctic Circle. The submarine, called the Omega, was launched in 1805 and Captain Craig MacKenzie is incredibly old despite his appearance. His bodyguard, Simba, has incredible strength and cannot be harmed by bullets. Serialized stories relate to their adventure as they battle the enemies of the underwater world of Latitude Zero (in particular, the evil Lucretia). The plots of the other episodes (17 in total) have been lost to time though the first episode has been preserved somewhere. The Japanese version credits Shinichi Sekizawa as the screenplay adviser, a role described by Stuart Galbraith IV as writing the Japanese version.

=== Filming ===
Unlike other 1960's Toho productions starring American actors, Latitude Zero was filmed entirely in English. The Japanese actors, including Akira Takarada and Akihiko Hirata, deliver all of their lines in English.

During the start of production, there were plans to film the movie in 70mm Panavision but the equipment was not available to Toho, so the format was switched back to CinemaScope.

In his autobiography Vanity Will Get You Somewhere, actor Joseph Cotten stated that the American producer Don Sharp sent the American cast to Japan just as his company was about to go bankrupt. Cotten noted that Toho picked up most, if not all the film's production budget.

Dr. Okada was originality played by Takamaru Sasaki (known for his roles in Throne of Blood, The Sword of Doom) but Sasaki became ill and was replaced by Tetsu Nakamura, which necessitated reshooting all scenes involving the character.

During shooting, there were two major points of consideration: the first involved the bath of immunity. At the time, the Motion Picture production code had just been lifted in America and Lewis wanted to take advantage by showing Lynda Haynes' breasts as she entered the bath. Honda refused to film such a shot and this included the idea of an alternate version just for her to appear naked, though she was not really nude during filming. Haynes remembered this topical matter like so: “They wanted me to be nude when getting out of the bath scene… I was told. ‘Well, in Japan, that’s no big deal.’ But I refused to do that, and they even put some kind of skin-colored foam rubber over by breasts to get me to do the scene - must have been a long shot.”

Honda's biography by Steve Ryfle and Ed Godziszewski states that the production companies initially planned to split the production cost of ¥360 million ($1 million) evenly and divide the worldwide rights, but after the American production company went bankrupt during filming, Toho took over the project; the budget was subsequently reduced to ¥289 million ($800,000). The American Film Institute mentioned the film as a "$1-million" co-production between Ambassador Productions and Toho. Japanese sources indicate that an initial agreement had Ambassador covering the American cast, Toho covering the Japanese cast and staff, with total production costs officially listed at 360 million yen but ultimately amounting to 289 million yen.

=== Special effects ===
The immense wall of smoke and flames which erupted from the explosion of the underwater volcano was created using a small water tank against which a camera was secured upside down beneath the water line. A sky backdrop was placed behind the water, and colored paints were poured into the water, creating billowing, smoke-like clouds. This same method was also used in Atragon (1963) and Dogora, the Space Monster (1964).

== Release ==
Latitude Zero was released in Japan on July 29, 1969 with a print that was dubbed into Japanese. It received a release in the United States by National General Pictures. Akira Takarada and Akihiko Hirata speak English in the English-language version and are not dubbed. The film received a test screening in Dallas in July 1969 and received a general theatrical release in December 1970. Its stateside roadshow theatrical release began in May 1970. The film was re-issued theatrically in Japan in 1974 on a double bill with Mothra as part of the Winter Toho Champion Festival.

== Reception ==
In contemporary reviews, Variety reviewed the film at the Venice Film Festival's buyer's market, referring to it as a "campy fun helped by sober playing and some deft underwater work, gadgets and movement." Roger Greenspun (New York Times) found Latitude Zero's plot to be "the weakest element", while noting that "The real virtue of the film lies in its charming and careful models, its ingenious special effects, its fruity interior décor, its elaborate network of television screens." The Monthly Film Bulletin stated that "it is a sad fact that the special effects are notably variable, and the model work in particular looks extremely shoddy" and the review concluded that "Toho studios seem to have employed their specialized talents and resources to produce an outlandish and expensive leg-pull."

== See also ==
- List of underwater science fiction works
