= Human Experiments =

1979 American horror film by Gregory Goodell

- Theatrical release poster
- Directed by: Gregory Goodell
- Screenplay by: Richard Rothstein
- Story by: Gregory Goodell
- Produced by: Gregory Goodell; Summer Brown
- Starring: Linda Haynes; Geoffrey Lewis; Ellen Travolta; Aldo Ray; Jackie Coogan; Lurene Tuttle
- Cinematography: João Fernandes
- Edited by: Barbara Pokras; Jon Gregory
- Music by: Mark Bucci
- Production company: Pyramid Entertainment
- Release date: May 12, 1979
- Running time: 78 minutes
- Country: United States
- Language: English

Human Experiments (also known as Beyond the Gate) is a 1979 American horror film directed and co-produced by Gregory Goodell. It stars Linda Haynes, Geoffrey Lewis, Ellen Travolta, Aldo Ray, Jackie Coogan and Lurene Tuttle. This film earned its notoriety for being targeted by the Director of Public Prosecutions during the video nasty furore in the early 1980s. Although it was listed on the first "video nasty" list issued by the DPP on July 4, 1983, the film was never prosecuted under the Obscene Publications Act and had originally been given an uncut (now defunct) X rating by the BBFC for theatrical release in 1979.

== Plot ==
Rachel Foster is a country singer traveling alone through the USA. She resists the advances of lecherous bar owner Mat Tibbs and, in her hurry to leave town, she accidentally wrecks her car. Looking for assistance, she finds what appears to be an abandoned house—but after stumbling inside the place, she discovers the scene of a grisly multiple homicide perpetrated by a young boy.

As no one believes that the child is responsible for such a horrific act, she is railroaded into a women's correctional facility by the prurient bar owner's brother, Sheriff Tibbs. As well as being falsely charged with the murders, the innocent musician now finds herself at the mercy of prison psychiatrist Dr. Kline, who has diabolical intentions. Kline has some radical techniques for "curing" criminality, and, after a failed escape attempt, she undergoes his 'treatment' and completely loses her mind, whereupon her name is changed to Sarah Jean Walker. Afterward, the warden gets notice that the boy woke up and confessed to killing his whole family. Kline, to keep Rachel under his thumb and to hide his radical therapy methods, tries to have Rachel kill the warden, but Rachel apparently regains her senses and breaks the programming. She shoots up the office and seems to wound Kline. Some time later, Rachel is seen once again singing in a dive bar; however, she now goes by her new name, Sarah Jean Walker.

== Cast ==
- Linda Haynes as Rachel Foster
- Geoffrey Lewis as Dr. Hans Kline
- Ellen Travolta as Mover
- Aldo Ray as Matt Tibbs
- Jackie Coogan as Sheriff Tibbs
- Lurene Tuttle as Granny
- Mercedes Shirley as Warden Weber
- Bobby Porter as Derril Willis
- Darlene Craviotto as Rita

== Home video ==
Scorpion Releasing released the film on Blu-ray in 2018, featuring an audio commentary track with director Greg Goodell.
