= Linda Haynes =

American actress (1947–2023)

- Born: November 4, 1947; Miami, Florida, U.S.
- Died: July 17, 2023 (aged 75); Summerville, South Carolina, U.S.
- Occupation: Actress

Linda Haynes (born Linda Lee Sylvander; November 4, 1947 – July 17, 2023) was an American actress who appeared in several films in the 1970s and early 1980s before retiring from the business and becoming a legal secretary. A life member of The Actors Studio, Haynes was best known for her roles in Coffy, The Nickel Ride and Rolling Thunder.

== Early life and career ==
Born in Miami, Florida, and raised in Miami and Caracas, Venezuela, Haynes was the first of three daughters born to Swedish parents. Her first film was Latitude Zero in 1969, which also starred Cesar Romero, Richard Jaeckel, and Joseph Cotten. She then went on to appear in films such as Coffy (1973), The Nickel Ride (1974), The Drowning Pool (1975), Rolling Thunder (1977), Human Experiments (1979), Guyana Tragedy: The Story of Jim Jones (1980), and Brubaker (1980). She also appeared in the episode of the 1974 television series Paper Moon, portraying Bonnie Parker.

She left the acting world in 1980 and was found in 1995 by director Quentin Tarantino and author Tom Graves. In 2015 Graves published a long profile about her titled Blonde Shadow: The Brief Career and Mysterious Disappearance of Actress Linda Haynes that is included in his anthology Louise Brooks, Frank Zappa, & Other Charmers & Dreamers.

== Critical evaluation ==
Although no comparably substantive treatments of her career have surfaced thus far, Graves and Tarantino are far from alone in citing the integrity of Haynes' work – though some also note a corresponding failure of filmmakers to put it to good use. In her 1977 review of Rolling Thunder in New York magazine, Molly Haskell wrote:

The men... come off better than the women because they are excused from ever uttering a word. Linda Haynes, who was so exciting and authentically rural in Robert Mulligan's Nickel Ride, has that most thankless role of the adoring and impossibly patient woman who must babble on to fill the silences.

In his book-length critique of cinema's track record, regarding the homecoming veteran, author Emmett Early discusses the same film:

Linda Haynes plays the barmaid with measured abandon. She says at one point, after Charlie has involved her in a violent scene, "Why do I get stuck with crazy men?" Charlie replies, "That's the only kind that's left." He describes himself as already dead when she tries to make love to him. Like Charlie, the movie fails to take advantage of her talents.

Reviewing the 2011 DVD release of The Nickel Ride, Slant Magazine's Fernando F. Croce (who elsewhere cites "the unheralded Linda Haynes") notes that its downtrodden protagonist (portrayed by sometime playwright Jason Miller):

nevertheless hangs on to a thread of taciturn self-respect largely thanks to his "cracker wife" Sarah (perennial "Whatever Happened To?" case Linda Haynes, a sort of thrift-store Sissy Spacek who can imprint a whole blowsy lifetime into the way she shimmies her hips).

Reviewing the same film, critic Glenn Erickson notes that the protagonist's "intensely loyal... ex-dancer girlfriend' is portrayed by "the remarkable Linda Haynes."

== Death ==
Haynes died in Summerville, South Carolina on July 17, 2023, at the age of 75. She was survived by her son and two grandchildren.
