= The Exploits of Fidelity Dove =

1924 novel by William Edward Vickers

- First edition dust cover
- Author: William Edward Vickers
- Language: English
- Genre: Mystery, Novels
- Publisher: Hodder & Stoughton
- Publication date: 1924
- Publication place: United Kingdom
- Media type: Print (Hardback )
- Pages: 320

The Exploits of Fidelity Dove is a mystery novel by William Edward Vickers. It was first published in 1924 under the pen name David Durham and then again in 1935 under Vicker's more popular pen name Roy Vickers. It is considered one of the rarest mystery books of the twentieth century.

== Plot overview ==
Fidelity Dove has been described as a femme fatale, a female master criminal, and an altruistic avenger. In the backmatter of one Vickers' other works she is described as "a lovely Puritan maid whose charm makes her irresistible - even to the detective whom she baffles at every turn."

Fidelity is an ash blonde with violet eyes, and is always clad in grey, an outward reflection of her puritan beliefs. She has the face of an angel and her beauty and charm have enabled her to gather a gang of highly skilled men: an actor, a scientist, a lawyer and others to assist her in her crimes. Her exploits consist of twelve tales:

1. A Face and a Fortune
2. Suspense
3. The Genuine Old Master
4. A Classic Forgery
5. The Gulverbery Diamonds
6. The Merchant Princess
7. Fourteen Hundred Percent
8. A Deal in Reputations
9. The Laughing Nymph
10. Proverbs and Prophets
11. The Meanest Man in Europe
12. The Great Kabul

There is a certain Robin Hood element to her crimes. Fidelity helps those who have been wronged, cheated or exploited, but in almost every tale her actions result in profits for herself and her gang of men.

== Reprints ==
The Fidelity Dove tales have only been reprinted four times in complete editions: three times in English and once in Japanese.

=== Complete Collection of 12 Tales ===
- The Exploits of Fidelity Dove, by David Durham. Hodder & Stoughton, 1924
- The Exploits of Fidelity Dove, by Roy Vickers. George Newnes, 1935
- The Exploits of Fidelity Dove, by Roy Vickers. ROH Press 2022 ISBN: 978-1998879007
- フィデリティ・ダヴの大仕事 Fideriti davu no ooshigoto (Japanese) Roy Vickers, Translator: Yuichi Hirayama, Kokushokankokai, 2011 ISBN: 978-4336054456

=== Individual Tales ===
Ellery Queen was the first American publisher to publish Fidelity Dove tales in his various publications. She made her debut in America in 1943 in The Female of the Species The Great Women Detectives and Criminals. Her appearances are listed below.

- The Great Kabul reprinted in * The Female of the Species The Great Women Detectives and Criminals. Edited by Ellery Queen. Little, Brown and Company, 1943., Boston, 1943
- The Meanest Man in Europe reprinted in:
- Ellery Queen's Mystery Magazine #19, November 1944
- Ellery Queen's Mystery Magazine “Overseas Edition for the Armed Forces” #19, November 1944
- Ellery Queen's Mystery Magazine (Australia) #31, January 1950
- Ellery Queen's Anthology #5, 1963, as by Roy Vickers
- Ellery Queen's Anthology #5, 1963, as by Roy Vickers

Other publishers, most notably Otto Penzler brought Miss Dove back into pront in the 21st century.

- A Classic Forgery reprinted in The Armchair Detective, October 1978
- The Genuine Old Master reprinted in: The Big Book of Rogues and Villains. Edited by Otto Penzler. Vintage Crime/Black Lizard, 2017 ISBN: 978-0525432487
- The Gulverbery Diamonds reprinted in: The Big Book of Locked Room Mysteries. Edited by Otto Penzler. Vintage Crime/Black Lizard, 2018 ISBN: 978-0307743961
- A Face and a Fortune reprinted in: Moriarty's Rivals: 14 Female Masterminds. ROH Press, 2020 ISBN: 978-1987886658

== Critical reception ==
Fidelity Dove's exploits have been fairly well received. In 1970 The New York Times Book Review ranked Vicker's The Exploits of Fidelity Dove and The Department of Dead Ends among the finest contemporary crime writing. Otto Penzler, writing in the Encyclopedia of Mystery and Detection (1976) described Miss Dove as “One of the most inventive and successful of all crooks.” Dorothy L. Sayers ranked her among the best female master criminals including her alongside John Kendrick Bangs' Mrs. Raffles, Frederick Irving Anderson's Sophie Lang, and Edgar Wallace's Four Square Jane.
