= Rolling Thunder (film) =

1977 film directed by John Flynn

- Theatrical release poster
- Directed by: John Flynn
- Screenplay by: Paul Schrader; Heywood Gould
- Story by: Paul Schrader
- Produced by: Norman T. Herman
- Starring: William Devane; Tommy Lee Jones; Linda Haynes
- Cinematography: Jordan Cronenweth
- Edited by: Frank P. Keller
- Music by: Barry De Vorzon
- Production companies: Lawrence Gordon Productions; TBC Film
- Distributed by: American International Pictures
- Release date: October 7, 1977 (Los Angeles)
- Running time: 100 minutes
- Country: United States
- Language: English
- Budget: $2 million

Rolling Thunder is a 1977 American neo-noir psychological thriller film directed by John Flynn, with a screenplay by Paul Schrader and Heywood Gould, based on a story by Schrader. It stars William Devane, Tommy Lee Jones, and Linda Haynes, along with James Best, Dabney Coleman, and Luke Askew in supporting roles. The film follows a Vietnam War veteran (Devane) who, after returning home to tragedy, sets out on a mission of revenge against the criminals who killed his family.

The film was originally set to be distributed by 20th Century Fox, but was dropped over concerns about the film's violence. It was instead distributed by American International Pictures (AIP). Rolling Thunder was released in the United States on October 7, 1977, and also premiered in seven other countries. Upon its release, the film received generally positive reviews from critics, and has developed a cult following.

== Plot ==
In 1973, U.S. Air Force Major Charles Rane returns home to San Antonio with U.S. Army Master Sergeant Johnny Vohden and two other soldiers, having spent seven years as a prisoner-of-war in North Vietnam. He finds a home very different from the one he left: his son, Mark, no longer remembers him, and his wife, Janet, is engaged to local policeman Cliff Nichols, despite still having feelings for Rane. Stoically accepting this, Rane focuses his energies on building a fatherly relationship with Mark, but privately self-imposes the same institutionalized regime he maintained while in captivity. At a grand homecoming ceremony, Rane is presented with a Cadillac and 2,555 silver dollars – one for every day he was captive, plus one for luck – by Linda Forchet, a "Texan belle" who wore his ID bracelet every day he was in Vietnam. Linda later makes advances toward him, but Rane has difficulty returning her affections.

When Rane returns home one day, four border outlaws are waiting for him: "The Texan", "Automatic Slim", "T-Bird", and "Melio". Having seen a report about his homecoming ceremony on television, they torture Rane for his silver dollars. Rane is unresponsive, having flashbacks to his torture in Vietnam. The gang resorts to shoving Rane's hand down a garbage disposal, mangling it. Upon their return home, Janet and Mark are immediately taken hostage. After Mark surrenders the dollars to save his father's life, the gang shoots the family and leaves them for dead; Rane survives, but his wife and son do not.

Rane recuperates in a hospital, where Linda and Vohden visit him. Uncertain about what to do with his life, Vohden has signed on for another 10 years in the Airborne Division. Rane withholds the identities of his attackers from Cliff and prepares to take revenge. Upon discharge, he saws down the double-barrelled shotgun Mark and Cliff had given to him as a present, and sharpens the prosthetic hook which has replaced his right hand. Before Rane leaves for Mexico, Linda agrees to accompany him, unaware of his true intentions. He sends her into a seedy Mexican bar to look for "Fat Ed". She is taken into a backroom where Lopez, a sleazy lowlife, immediately harasses her; Rane rescues her while extracting some information. Realizing Rane's scheme, Linda begrudgingly continues to help. Then, at a bar in a nearby town, they find Automatic Slim. A vicious fight ensues; Rane escapes only by wounding Automatic Slim in the crotch with his hook hand.

Meanwhile, Cliff discovers Rane's plan after finding the sawn-off barrel of the shotgun. Using his police contacts to trace Rane's car, he travels to the town where Rane encountered Lopez. He is led to Lopez, and they engage in a scuffle. After Lopez leads Cliff on a foot chase through a stockyard into an abandoned house, a gunfight follows. Cliff kills Lopez and two other attackers before Automatic Slim sneaks up from behind and shoots him dead.

Linda and Rane grow close while on the road; Linda describes her tomboy past, and Rane talks about the things he liked before the war. In a motel in El Paso, the pair share a moment of intimacy, during which Linda tries to talk Rane out of revenge one last time. He leaves a sleeping Linda behind in the motel with a sizable sum of money, and despite her earlier insistence that she would call the police, she cannot bring herself to do so.

After staking out the killers as they visit a whorehouse in Juárez, Rane, in full uniform, visits Vohden at his El Paso home, finding him to be emotionally distant from his family. Upon Rane informing him of the plan, Vohden immediately dons his uniform and is ready to go, asking no questions. They return to the brothel, where Vohden picks up a prostitute. Once they are upstairs, Rane sneaks in via the fire escape. He signals to Vohden, kicking off a bloody shootout in which the Texan, T-Bird, Melio, and several other men are shot dead before the final standoff between Rane and Automatic Slim. Rane kills him, then emotionlessly shoots him several times. Bloodied and wounded, Rane and Vohden, supporting each other, stagger out of the brothel.

== Cast ==
- William Devane as MAJ. Charles Rane
- Tommy Lee Jones as MSG. Johnny Vohden
- Linda Haynes as Linda Forchet
- James Best as "The Texan"
- Dabney Coleman as Maxwell
- Lisa Blake Richards as Janet Rane
- Luke Askew as "Automatic Slim"
- Lawrason Driscoll as Deputy Cliff Nichols
- James Victor as Lopez
- Cassie Yates as Candy
- Jordan Gerler as Mark Rane
- Randy Hermann as Billy Sanchez
- Charles Escamilla as "T-Bird"
- Pete Ortega as "Melio"
- Jacque Burandt as Bebe
- Paul A. Partain as Ethan
- James N. Harrell as Grandpa

== Production ==
=== Writing and casting ===
The film was originally written in 1973 for AIP, where Lawrence Gordon was head of production. During this time George A. Romero was slated to direct the film. Gordon then took the script with him when he left for Columbia, and for a time writer Paul Schrader was going to direct. However that fell through and the film was set up at 20th Century Fox.

John Milius said Schrader wrote the movie for Milius to direct but Milius turned it down. "I didn't think I wanted to do something that dark at the time ... Boy it was a good script, with wonderful stuff in it. Paul at his best." In the original script, Rane was a "a Texas trash racist who had become a war hero without ever having fired a gun", and the story ended in his death. Schrader's original script was also a companion piece to Taxi Driver (1976), which contains several references to Operation Rolling Thunder, and included a cameo appearance by that film's protagonist Travis Bickle.

Schrader's script was rewritten by Heywood Gould. It starred William Devane who director John Flynn says "back then they were priming ... [him] to be a big film star". Other actors considered for the lead role were Joe Don Baker and David Carradine, but both declined upon reading the script.

=== Filming ===
The movie was shot in San Antonio, Pearsall, and Del Rio, Texas in 31 days. The cinematographer was Jordan Cronenweth. Flynn:

We knew we were doing something fairly bold. The producer, Lawrence Gordon, told me to shoot the garbage disposal scene like open-heart surgery, make it as bloody as I possibly could. So I did. When we submitted Rolling Thunder to the MPAA (Motion Picture Association of America) for a rating, we expected deep cuts, but the censors passed uncut one of the most violent movies in the history of film. Rolling Thunder was given an R rating!

The production was denied permission to film at Lackland Air Force Base, so the opening sequence was shot at a nearby civilian airport instead.

=== Editing and distribution ===
==== Test screening ====
The film was originally produced and scheduled for release by Twentieth Century-Fox. The studio previewed it in San Jose for an audience who had just watched the Dirty Harry film, The Enforcer.

Director Flynn later explained, "The first 20 minutes of the film were placid by design -- Devane's homecoming, reunited with his family. Then violence overtakes this family. In the space of two minutes, Devane's hand is ground off and his wife and son are shot dead before his eyes."

The preview audience did not react well to this. In his book, Adventures in the Screen Trade, William Goldman characterized this as "the most violent sneak reaction of recent years ... the audience actually got up and tried to physically abuse the studio personnel present among them."

"The lobby looked like Guadalcanal", recalled producer Gordon. "Which, by the way, is a salesman's dream."

Flynn says Fox screened the film for psychiatrists in an attempt to learn what it was that so disturbed the audience. Recalls Flynn,

They determined that it was like a symbolic castration. So, seeing it incited a (negative) reaction akin to the sneak of the original Exorcist ...Home is supposedly the place where everyone feels safest. When people are reminded that the home is vulnerable, which we all know it is, that's disturbing.

Flynn says,

There were several discussions about what Fox should do with Rolling Thunder -- cut it, re-edit it or what.

Fox insisted on making cuts but Gordon refused and he took the film to American International Pictures (AIP).

Devane later recalled:

It probably would've made a big difference if they'd actually released it properly. But when they tested it ... the Mexicans set the theater on fire! They were really, really, really down on it. So then the studio backed way off, and it never got the release it would've if they'd really jumped on it and supported it. But I didn't understand how to operate in those days. I still don't know how to operate. [Laughs.] But a movie star guy would've done everything he could to force them to release it properly, you know? And Tommy [Lee Jones] and I were just starting. God, that was the first featured role I ever did. Good picture, though. It's a really good picture ... You know, they tried to do the same thing to Warren Beatty with Bonnie and Clyde. But Warren was hip enough and smart enough and knew how to put enough pressure on them to get them to release that picture. And I didn't know how to do that. I didn't have any idea.

== Release ==
Flynn says AIP "distributed it, as is, without re-cutting it. It made them a fortune." It opened in Los Angeles on October 7, 1977, and in New York City one week later.

For reasons still not convincingly stated, the film was released in Spain in 1982 as El expreso de Corea ("The Korean Express"), sometimes spelled in the media with a hyphen (ex-preso), which translates as "The former prisoner [literally, convict] from Korea". A Korean War setting was included as well in the Spanish dubbing instead of the original Vietnam War scenario. A possible reason could be the title's slight similarity with the hugely successful El expreso de medianoche (Midnight Express), which was released earlier in Spain. However, the replacement of Vietnam by Korea is still left unexplained—even more so considering the fact that the time span of the Korean War, 1950–1953, conflicts with the alleged 7-year stay as POWs in the camp and the actual 1973 setting of the film.

=== Home media ===
The film was released on Blu-ray and DVD in the United Kingdom by StudioCanal UK on January 30, 2012. It was released on Manufactured On Demand DVD by MGM in January 2011. It was released on Blu-ray in the United States by Shout! Factory on May 28, 2013.

== Reception ==
=== Critical response ===
Upon release, Rolling Thunder received praise for its action sequences, atmosphere, direction, music and cast performances, but was criticized for its pace and violent climax. On Rotten Tomatoes, the film has an 82% score, based on 17 reviews, with an average rating of 6.9/10. LA Weekly, Letterboxd, and The Grindhouse Database list this movie as belonging to the vetsploitation subgenre.

Gary Arnold of The Washington Post wrote in his review, "Flynn's crisp, laconic direction and evocative use of Southern Texas locations transform Rolling Thunder, now at area theaters, into a more distinctive exploitation movie than it deserves to be." Vincent Canby of The New York Times noted that "the movie has some good things, but in the way it has been directed by John Flynn it moves so easily and sort of foolishly toward its violent climax, that all the tension within the main character Charlie has long since escaped the film." Jim Harwood in Variety noted, "Its excellent cast performs well, but not well enough; Paul Schrader's story is strong, but not strong enough; and the violence will be too much for some and not enough for others. In sum it neither rolls nor thunders, but with luck, it might just stumble on to a portion of the audience that hailed Schrader's Taxi Driver." Gene Siskel of the Chicago Tribune gave the film three stars out of four and wrote that "what I like about Rolling Thunder is not the predictable orgy of violence that concludes the picture, but what goes on before—the return of the veteran to his hometown and disjointed family. ... I liked its portrayal of Devane's state of mind. The emotional violence he suffers is more stunning than any physical torture." He ranked it #10 on his year-end list of the best films of 1977. Kevin Thomas of the Los Angeles Times slammed the film as "one of the most revolting exploitation pictures to come along in some time" and called it "some kind of ultimate in cynical calculation. The whole numbing predicament of the POW is perceptively, credibly depicted—but only to set up the carnage that follows. Surely, the POWs don't deserve this kind of exploitation on the screen."

Filmmaker Quentin Tarantino has called Rolling Thunder one of his favorite films, naming it in his top ten in the 2012 Sight and Sound Greatest Films of All Time poll. In his book Cinema Speculation, Tarantino called it "the greatest savage, fascist, Revengeamatic flick ever made." Rolling Thunder Pictures, a company founded by Tarantino that briefly distributed reissues of cult films, was named after the film.

Arnaud Dephalese notes that, after several films that addressed the subject indirectly, Rolling Thunder was one of the very first American films to explicitly address the Vietnam War through the theme of a veteran suffering from post-traumatic stress disorder

== See also ==
- List of films featuring home invasions
- Operation Rolling Thunder
