= On Thursday We Leave for Home =

- The Twilight Zone episode
- Episode no.: Season 4 Episode 16
- Directed by: Buzz Kulik
- Written by: Rod Serling
- Production code: 4868
- Original air date: May 2, 1963

Guest appearances
- James Whitmore; Tim O'Connor; James Broderick; Paul Langton; Jo Helton; Mercedes Shirley; Russ Bender; Danny Kulick; Madge Kennedy; John Ward; Shirley O'Hara; Tony Benson; Lew Gallo

Episode chronology
← Previous "The Incredible World of Horace Ford"	Next → "Passage on the Lady Anne"
- The Twilight Zone (1959 TV series) (season 4)

"On Thursday We Leave for Home" is an episode of the American television anthology series The Twilight Zone. In this episode, a struggling colony on a distant planet, led by William Benteen (played by James Whitmore), awaits a ship that promises to return them to Earth. When the ship finally arrives, a power struggle develops as Benteen refuses to give up his position over the colonists. The episode serves as a parable about the dynamics of power, the hubris of those in positions of power, and individualism versus collectivism.

== Opening narration ==
This is William Benteen, who officiates on a disintegrating outpost in space. The people are a remnant society who left the Earth looking for a millennium, a place without war, without jeopardy, without fear, and what they found was a lonely, barren place whose only industry was survival. And this is what they've done for three decades: survive; until the memory of the Earth they came from has become an indistinct and shadowed recollection of another time and another place. One month ago a signal from Earth announced that a ship would be coming to pick them up and take them home. In just a moment we'll hear more of that ship, more of that home, and what it takes out of mind and body to reach it. This is the Twilight Zone.

== Plot ==
In 1991, 113 people built a settlement on the desert planet V9-Gamma, hoping to escape the frequent wars on Earth. However, life proved difficult under the perpetual heat and daylight of two suns, so in 2021 the settlers sent out a transmission requesting transport back to Earth. The group's leader, Captain Benteen, was 15 when the expedition left Earth. Through firm authority, ardent faith, and willingness to make tough decisions, he has kept the group of (now) 187 men, women and children from descending into anarchy, giving up hope, or falling victim to the planet's hazards, including overheating, dehydration, and meteor showers. Life is very hard and suicide is not uncommon. Following the discovery of another one, a young woman who has hanged herself, they bury her, and Benteen delivers a stern sermon and lecture. A meteor shower forces them into the main cave, and he's again asked to tell stories about home. The settlers, most of whom were born on V9-Gamma, hang on his every word when he tells them about Earth.

Six months after the transmission, a rescue mission from Earth arrives, led by Colonel Sloane. Sloane tells them they have three days to prepare for their journey home. The settlers are jubilant. However, Benteen and Sloane soon begin butting heads. Benteen is upset to see that his power over the settlers is already dwindling; they are entranced by Sloane's stories of the modern Earth and disregard Benteen's warnings when Sloane encourages them to play an impromptu game of baseball in the extreme heat. Sloane implores Benteen to relax and relinquish command of the settlers, but Benteen stubbornly refuses, insisting that as long as they are on V9-Gamma, he is in command. Sloane seeks to preserve peace by agreeing to Benteen's demand that his crew be isolated from the colonists until the day of departure.

When Benteen tells Sloane that he intends to petition the US government for a land grant so that the colonists can remain together as an intentional community, Sloane is aghast at the idea and says he should discuss it with the colonists rather than assuming their approval. When he does so, Benteen learns the colonists have already made plans to settle in different states, and have no enthusiasm for his plan to stay together. Benteen accuses Sloane of bringing selfishness into the community but Sloane argues that he brought nothing more than a means of escape from V9-Gamma: the settlers have never had any choice but to follow Benteen's leadership and can now act for themselves. Benteen is unfazed by Sloane's words. He attempts to persuade everyone to stay on V9-Gamma by characterizing Earth as a place of violence and hardship, saying none of them belong there. Sloane, finally fed up with Benteen's stubbornness, tells the settlers that while Earth isn't a paradise, it at least will give them the opportunity to think and act for themselves. Everyone, save for Benteen, chooses to return home. Benteen, in desperation, attacks the ship with a length of pipe, only to be stopped physically by Sloane and his men. Having convinced himself of his new negative image of Earth, Benteen says that he will remain behind, alone if he must.

As the colonists board the ship, Sloane and the colony's engineer, Al Baines, search for Benteen to give him one last chance to change his mind, but he hides in the cave that had sheltered his people. As the ship takes off, Benteen tells his stories of Earth to the settlers as if they are still sitting with him. Remembering the beauty of Earth, he realizes that he wants to go home. He rushes out screaming for the ship to come back, but it is too late. Benteen is now stranded on V9-Gamma for the rest of his life, completely alone.

== Closing narration ==
William Benteen, who had prerogatives: he could lead, he could direct, dictate, judge, legislate. It became a habit, then a pattern and finally a necessity. William Benteen, once a god, now a population of one.

== Production notes ==
The rescue crew's ship and uniforms were leftover props from MGM's 1956 film Forbidden Planet.

Early in the episode, as Benteen and the engineer discuss trouble with the cooling unit that keeps the individual home caves cool, the boom mic can clearly be seen at the bottom of the screen.

A crew member shirt, also used in the episode "Death Ship", was offered at auction in late September 2015 by Profiles in History with an estimated value of $1,000 to $1,500, with a winning bid of $1,600 by Mathew G. Perrone, a private collector.

== Cast ==
- James Whitmore as Captain William Benteen
- Tim O'Connor as Colonel Sloane
- James Broderick as Al Bains
- Paul Langton as George
- Jo Helton as Julie Bains
- Mercedes Shirley as Joan
- Russ Bender as Hank
- Daniel Kulick as Jo-Jo
- Lew Gallo as Lt. Engle
- Madge Kennedy as Colonist
- John Ward as Colonist
- Shirley O'Hara as Colonist
- Tony Benson as Colonist

== Sources ==
- Zicree, Marc Scott: The Twilight Zone Companion. Sillman-James Press, 1982 (second edition)
- DeVoe, Bill. (2008). Trivia from The Twilight Zone. Albany, GA: Bear Manor Media. ISBN 978-1-59393-136-0
- Grams, Martin. (2008). The Twilight Zone: Unlocking the Door to a Television Classic. Churchville, MD: OTR Publishing. ISBN 978-0-9703310-9-0
