= The Werewolf of Woodstock =

- Written by: Bill Lee; Hank Saroyan
- Directed by: John Moffitt
- Starring: Michael Parks; Harold J. Stone; Meredith MacRae; Belinda Balaski; Andrew Stevens; Danny Michael Mann
- Country of origin: United States
- Original language: English

Production
- Producers: Dick Clark; Bill Lee; Hank Saroyan
- Editor: Leslie Bender
- Running time: 74 minutes

Original release
- Network: ABC
- Release: January 24, 1975

The Werewolf of Woodstock is a 1975 television film directed by John Moffitt and starring Michael Parks, Harold J. Stone, Meredith MacRae, Belinda Balaski, and Danny Michael Mann. It was filmed on videotape and produced for ABC's The Wide World of Mystery by Dick Clark's production company with make-up effects by Joe Blasco.

== Plot summary ==
On a night soon after Woodstock has ended, a hippie-hating local farmer named Bert (Tige Andrews) heads out in a drunken rage to the rubbish strewn festival site and gets his chromosomes scrambled when he receives a massive jolt of electricity trying to smash one of the still standing stages that, unfortunately for him, is still attached to the power lines. Family physician Dr. Marlow (Richard Webb) bandages his burns and says he will recover if he gets plenty of bed rest, but during the very next electrical storm he transforms into a shaggy, snarling werewolf with massive lupine jaws (stuntman John "Bud" Cardos).

A struggling young hippie rock band shows up at the Woodstock site, intending to record an album on the stage where famous rock icons had performed (and thus be able to stick a label on their demo tape saying "recorded live at Woodstock"), and quickly begin to have run-ins with not only the local police but also the hippie-hating werewolf. First, their dog is attacked and killed by the hairy horror, and later female band member Beckie (Belinda Balaski) is kidnapped by the creature and locked away in an abandoned building. The farmer keeps transforming during electrical storms and nobody realizes what's going on until one stormy night Bert changes into his furry, fang-faced form in front of his wife.

Up until this point local lawman Lt. Martoni (Harold J. Stone) thinks it has all been the work of some leftover drugged-out hippie, but "big city detectives" Moody (Michael Parks) and Kendy (Meredith MacRae) sent from Los Angeles to monitor the goings-on at Woodstock had already figured out a werewolf was involved in all these murders (in addition to the dog, the werewolf had gone on to kill a policeman and the doctor), and now that they know who the werewolf is they form a plan of attack which involves luring the creature out into the open with the one the thing it hates most, rock music, and then confusing it long enough to tranquilize it and capture it.

Despite the best and loudest efforts of Beckie's bandmates the plan fails, and Bert, now permanently transformed into a monstrous man-beast even during storm-free daylight hours, runs back to the abandoned building, grabs his terrified hostage and escapes with her by stealing a convenient dune buggy with the police in hot pursuit.

They end up at a power station where Moody chases the werewolf up the metalwork. His partner Kendy arrives with a newly made silver bullet, and as Bert attempts to kill the detective at the top of the station, Martino shoots at it from the ground, and the werewolf falls to his death.

== Cast ==
- Michael Parks as Moody
- Harold J. Stone as Lieutenant Martoni
- Meredith MacRae as Kendy
- Ann Doran as Cora
- Richard Webb as Dr. John Marlow
- Belinda Balaski as Beckie
- Tige Andrews as Bert Anderson/The Werewolf
- Robert Weaver as Tom the guitarist
- Andrew Stevens as Dave the bassist
- Danny Michael Mann as Vinnie the drummer
- Dean Webber as Newsman
- John O'Connell as Serviceman
- Bobby Clark as Officer London
- Bob Dix as Officer Best
- Floyd Carver as 1st Officer
- Gary Johnson as 2nd Officer

== Reception ==
Dread Central gave the film 2 1/2 stars out of 5, stating that it "will never be confused with a good movie, not by a long shot, not in your wildest dreams; but if you have any affection for cinema “so bad it’s good” then this is a very hard-to-find movie that’s well worth seeking out".

== See also ==
- List of American films of 1975
