= Mercedes Shirley =

American actress (1926–1999)

- Mercedes Shirley in Alfred Hitchcock Presents 1957
- Born: January 6, 1926; Billings, Montana, U.S.
- Died: January 29, 1999 (aged 73); Sherman Oaks, California, U.S.
- Occupation: Actress
- Years active: 1955–2018
- Spouse: Robert Pender (m. 1959; died 1969)
- Children: unknown

Mary Mercedes Shirley (January 6, 1926 – January 29, 1999) was an American actress. She appeared in television programs including The Twilight Zone, 77 Sunset Strip, The Invaders, Alfred Hitchcock Presents and Gunsmoke. Shirley died in January 1999 of natural causes at her home in Sherman Oaks, California, at the age of 73.

== Television ==
Year	Title	Role	Notes
1955	I Led 3 Lives	Comrade Rose	Episode "Central American"
1956	Lux Video Theater	Max	Episode "Witness to a Murder"
1956	Matinee Theatre	Mary Lincoln (younger)	Episode "The Heart of Mary Lincoln"
1956	Highway Patrol	Kay Denson	Episode "Plant Robbery"
1956	The Lineup		Episode "The Adams Case"
1956	This Is the Life	Carol	Episode "Pardon for the Penitent"
1956	I Led 3 Lives	Comrade Louise Crown	Episode "Dynamite"
1956	Climax!		Episode "Savage Portrait"
1957	The Lone Ranger	Martha Barrett	Episode "The Tarnished Star"
1957	Alfred Hitchcock Presents	Mrs. Davidson	Season 3 Episode 5: "Silent Witness"
1957	Have Gun – Will Travel	Mazie	Episode "The Colonel and the Lady"
1957	Climax!		Episode "To Walk the Night"
1959	The Millionaire	Edna Crane	Episode "Millioinaire Marcia Forrest"
1959	Philip Marlowe	Julia Fransen	Episode "The Hunger"
1961	Cain's Hundred	Katherine Strode	Episode "The Penitant: Louis Strode"
1962	Gunsmoke	Mary Pickett	Episode "The Do-Badder"
1962	Target: The Corruptors!	Rose	Episode "Fortress of Despair"
1962	Thriller	Jill Naylor	Episode "Man of Mystery"
1962	Route 66	Woman Guest	Episode "From and Enchantress Fleeing"
1963	The Eleventh Hour	Joan's Sister	Episode "Like a Diamond in the Sky"
1963	77 Sunset Strip	Queenie Magee	Episode "Target Island"
1963	The Twilight Zone	Joan	Episode "On Thursday We Leave for Home"
1963	My Three Sons	Mrs. Riley	Episode "Chip's World"
1963	My Three Sons	Mrs. Kaye	Episode "Big Chief Bub"
1963	Breaking Point	Emma	Episode "Don't Cry, Baby, Don't Cry"
1963	The Richard Boone Show		Episode "Where's the Million Dollars?"
1964	Ben Casey	Laura Smith	Episode "One Nation Indivisible"
1967	The Invaders	Woman Attendant	Episode "Panic"
1973	Human Experiments	Warden Weber	
1979	Young Love, First Love	Miss Holmes	TV movie
1991	Defenseless	Receptionist in Dubbing Studio	
1995	The Clinic	Nurse Delmore	Episode #1.1
