= Joe Blasco =

American makeup artist (born 1947)

- Born: April 30, 1947 (age 78); Jeannette, Pennsylvania, U.S.
- Website: www.joeblasco.comarchived

Joe Blasco (born April 30, 1947, in Jeannette, Pennsylvania) is an American makeup artist.

== Career ==
Blasco has worked in Hollywood for 50 years and founded his own eponymous cosmetics company in 1983. (Note: Joe Blasco cosmetics company is no longer in business as of 2024. However, as of July 2025, some of his makeup products are still available.) In 1973, he founded the Joe Blasco Make-up Training Center in Hollywood and later opened a second location in Orlando, Florida in 1991. During the 1970s and 1980s, he worked on a variety of television shows, including The Red Skelton Show, The Dating Game, The Newlywed Game, General Hospital, Good Morning America, and The Carol Burnett Show. He directed makeup for films such as Ilsa, She Wolf of the SS, Albert Einstein – The Man Behind the Genius, The Werewolf of Woodstock, and Shivers and was the personal makeup artist for actors such as Orson Welles, Olivia Newton-John, Marlene Dietrich, Lauren Bacall, and Bette Midler; as well as teaching make-up techniques to Kim Kardashian when she was a teenager. He has been credited with inventing the bladder technique found in horror movies as well as special effects such as blisters and skin rashes. In 2004, he was given a distinguished achievement award in the makeup design category from the United States Institute for Theatre Technology.
