= William Edward Vickers =

English writer (1889–1965)

in 1921 by Bassano Ltd. National Portrait Gallery

William Edward Vickers (1889–1965) was an English mystery writer better known under his pen name Roy Vickers, but used also the pseudonyms Roy C. Vickers, David Durham, Sefton Kyle, and John Spencer. He is the author of over 60 crime novels and 80 short stories. Vickers is now remembered mostly for his attribution to Scotland Yard of a Department of Dead Ends, specialized in solving old, sometimes long-forgotten cases, mostly by chance encounters of odd bits of strange and apparently disconnected evidence.

He was educated at Charterhouse School, and left Brasenose College, Oxford without a degree. For some time he studied law at the Middle Temple, but never practised. He married Mary Van Rossem and they had one son. He worked as a journalist, as a court reporter and as a magazine editor; he also wrote a large number of nonfiction articles and sold hundreds of them to newspapers and magazines. Between November 1913 and February 1917, twenty short stories by Vickers were published in The Novel Magazine. About this time he published his first book, a biography of Field Marshal Frederick, Earl Roberts. In 1924 he published The Exploits of Fidelity Dove under the name David Durham, one of the rarest mystery books of the twentieth century.

In September 1934, The Rubber Trumpet, the first of thirty-eight stories featuring the fictitious Department of Dead Ends, appeared in Pearson's Magazine. In 1960 he edited the Crime Writers' Association's anthology of short stories Some Like Them Dead. The Manchester Evening News called one of his collections, "one of the half-dozen successful books of detective short stories published since the days of Sherlock Holmes".

Vickers's work has been adapted for film and TV, including Girl in the News (1940), Violent Moment (1959), A Question of Suspense (1961), and three episodes of Alfred Hitchcock Presents (Season 3: 1957–58).

== Non-Fiction as Roy Vickers ==
- Lord Roberts: the Story of His Life (1914)

== As Roy Vickers ==
=== Novels ===
- Humbugs Ltd. Serialised, The Novel Magazine, June to October 1914
- Bonnie Mary Myles or The Mystery of Old Monkland (1919). Serialised, Dundee People's Journal, 1919
- The Woman without a Soul (1920)
- The Lady of Lombard Street (1920)
- The Man from Dartmoor. Serialised, Chicago Tribune, 1920
- The Brown Arm. Serialised, Chicago Tribune, 1920
- The Fatal Necklace (1920). Serialised, San Francisco Examiner, 12, 19 and 26 September 1920
- The Thief of Love (1921). Serialised, Dundee Evening Telegraph, 1921
- The Mystery of the Scented Death (1921)
- The Vengeance of Henry Jarroman. Serialised, London Daily Mail, 17 March to 17 May 1921; and Chicago Tribune, 1922
- The Marriage Flaw. Serialised, Chicago Tribune, 1922
- The Door to Desire. Serialised as The Dominant Desire, London Daily Mail, 2 May to 28 June 1922; and Chicago Tribune, 1922
- The Gay Adventure (1922). Serialised, Dundee Evening Telegraph, 1922
- The Woman Accused (1923). Serialised as Suppressed Evidence, London Daily Mail, 14 June 14 to 25 July 1923, and reprinted in other newspapers Dundee Evening Telegraph, 1923
- Ishmael's Wife (1924)
- Murder for a Million (1924)
- The Man in the Shadow. Serialised, Chicago Tribune, 1924
- The Man She Bought. Serialised, San Francisco Examiner, 1924
- Four Past Four (1925). Serialised, Melbourne Herald
- The Pearl-Headed Pin. Serialised, Chicago Tribune, 1925
- The Master of Money. London Daily Mail, 1 July to 19 August 1925
- The Unforbidden Sin (1926). Expanded from the novella qv
- His Other Wife (1926)
- The White Raven (1927). Serialised, London Daily Mail, 17 November 1926 to 25 January 1927
- They Wouldn't Believe. Serialised, Chicago Tribune, 1927
- Seals of Silence. Serialised, San Francisco Examiner, 1928
- Master of Money. Serialised, (Wilkes-Barre) Evening News, 1928
- The Radingham Mystery (1928)
- A Girl of These Days (1929). Serialised as If Love Should Change, 26 November 1928 to 14 January 1929
- The Hawk. Serialised, Chicago Tribune, 1929
- Hidden Gold (1929). Serialised, London Evening News and other newspapers, for example Derby Evening Telegraph, 1929
- The Rose in the Dark (1930). Serialised, Michigan Times Herald, 1930
- The Victim (1930). Serialised, Topical Times, 1930
- The Gold Game (1930)
- Deputy for Cain (1931). Serialised, Melbourne Herald, 1931, as The Deputy for Cain
- The Mystery of the Scented Death (1931)
- The Girl in His Way (1932). Serialised, (Dundee) Sunday Post, 1932
- The Whisperer. Serialised, Chicago Tribune, 1932. Published as The Whispering Death (1947)
- The Marriage for the Defence (1932)
- Bardelow's Heir (1933)
- Swell Garrick. Serialised, Chicago Tribune, 1933
- Money Buys Everything (1934)
- The Forgotten Honeymoon. Serialised, Chicago Tribune, 1934
- Kidnap Island (1934). Serialised, Tit-Bits, 1934
- The Exploits of Fidelity Dove (1935)
- Hide Those Diamonds (1935)
- Four Past Four (1935)
- Too Dangerous to Live (1937). Serialised, Topical Times, 1937
- I'll Never Tell (1937). Serialised, Chicago Tribune, 1936; and Daily Mirror, 1936
- Find This Girl. Serialised (New York) Daily News, 1937
- The Girl in the News (1937)
- The Life Between (1938)
- The Enemy Within (1938)
- Fate Calls the Tune (1939). Serialised, Newcastle Weekly Chronicle, 1939
- The Girl in the Shadows. Serialised, (New York) Daily News, 1940
- She Walked in Fear (1940)
- Playgirl Wanted (1940)
- Brenda Gets Married (1941)
- War Bride (1941)
- Six Came to Dinner (1942)
- A Date with Danger (1942)
- The Girl Who Stood Alone. Serialised, Chicago Tribune, 1942
- The Wicked Mrs Steel. Serialised, Chicago Tribune, 1945
- A King's Ransom. Serialised, (New York) Daily News, 1947
- Murder at Bishop's Runt. (New York) Daily News, 18 and 25 July 1948
- The Department of Dead Ends (1949) – short story collection
- Blackmail. Boston Globe, 9 October 1949
- Death's Warning. Boston Globe, 16 October 1949
- Murder of a Snob (1949)
- Dinner for Two. Boston Globe, 12 February 1950
- Maid to Murder (1950)
- On the Road. Boston Globe, 7 May 1950
- Murdering Mr Velfrage (1950)
- Anointed Quinine. Boston Globe, 4 June 1950
- Gold and Wine (1950)
- They Can't Hang Caroline (1950)
- Murder Will Out (1950) – short story collection
- The Snatch Racket. Boston Globe, 22 April 1951
- The Sole Survivor and The Kynsard Affair (1952)
- The Fire Bug. Philadelphia Inquirer, 21 June 1953
- Eight Murders in the Suburbs (1950) – short story collection
- Double Image (1955) – short story collection
- Seven Chose Murder (1959) – short story collection
- Find the Innocent (1959)
- The Girl Who Wouldn't Talk (1960)
- Best Detective Stories (1965) – short story collection

=== Short stories ===
- The Stolen Melody. Sheffield Weekly Telegraph, 21 June 1913
- Harwood's Discovery. Sheffield Weekly Telegraph, 11 October 1913
- The Goth. The Novel Magazine, November 1913
- The House that Didn't Exist. Sheffield Weekly Telegraph, 22 November 1913
- Duplicates. Pearson's Weekly, [Date to be confirmed], 1913. Reprinted Nebraska State Journal, 25 October 1913
- TITLE UNKNOWN. Chambers's Journal, April 1914
- The Hands of the Clock. The Novel Magazine, July 1915
- Polite Society. The Novel Magazine, October 1915
- Somewhere in London. The Novel Magazine, November 1915
- The Secret Remedy. The Novel Magazine, December 1915
- The Lost Platoons. The Novel Magazine, January 1916
- The Blackleg. Pearson's Weekly, 28 March 1916
- The Unforbidden Sin. The Novel Magazine, March to June 1916. Reprinted: Detective Story Magazine, 23 and 30 October 1917
- Honours Easy. The Novel Magazine, January 1917
- "Petticoat Influence". The Royal Magazine. 38: 40–46. May 1917.
- Blackmail. Detective Story Magazine, 11 December 1917
- A Champion of Poverty. Detective Story Magazine, 25 December 1917
- Instinct vs Logic. Detective Story Magazine, 1 January 1918
- A Dicker in Art. Detective Story Magazine, 15 January 1918
- The Man from Dartmoor. Serialised, Topical Times, Vol 1 No 1 (18 October 1919) – DATE OF ISSUE UNKNOWN
- TITLE UNKNOWN. Ideas Magazine, Christmas 1924
- TITLE UNKNOWN. Pearson's Weekly, October 1927
- The Red Ember· Complete Detective Novel Magazine, December 1932
- The Rubber Trumpet. Pearson's Magazine, September 1934
- The Starting-Handle Murder. Pearson's Magazine, October 1934
- The Three-Foot Grave. Pearson's Magazine, November 1934
- TITLE UNKNOWN. Pearson's Magazine, March 1935
- According to Plan. The Thriller, 26 October 1935
- The Notorious Miss Walters. Radio Review No 1, October – November 1935
- The Man Who Murdered in Public. Fiction Parade, 1935
- The Case of Poor Gertrude. Fiction Parade, 1935
- Murder in Mayfair.
- The Yellow Jumper
- The Hen-Pecked Murderer
- A Toy for Jiffy
- The Case of the Social Climber
- A Man and His Mother-in-Law, reprinted in: Murder by the Book, British Library Crime Classics, 2021
- The House-in-Your-Hand
- Little Things Like That
- Kill Me, kill My Dog
- The Nine-Pound Murder
- Marion, Come Back
- The parrot's beak
- A fool and her money
- The lady who laughed
- The snob's murder
- The Cowboy of Oxford Street
- The Clue of the Red Carnations
- Blind Man's Buff
- The Meanest Man in Europe
- The Case of the Merry Andrew
- Mean Man's Murder
- The Man Who Was Murdered by a Bed
- The Case of the Honest Murderer
- The Eight Pieces of Tortoiseshell
- Dinner for Two
- The Crocodile Case
- Wit's End
- The Patchwork Murder
- The Man with the Sneer
- The Hair Shirt
- The Man Who Could Not Hold Women
- Miss Paisley's Cat
- Little Things Like That
- The Frame-Up
- The Man Who Punished Himself
- Double Image
- The Color of Truth

== As Sefton Kyle ==
=== Novels ===
- The Man in the Shadow (1924)
- Dead Man's Dower (1925)
- Guilty – But (1927)
- The Hawk (1930
- The Bloomsbury Treasure (1930)
- Red Hair (1933)
- The Life He Stole (1933)
- The Man without a Name (1935)
- Silence (1935)
- Number 73 (1936)
- The Durand Case (1936)
- The Notorious Miss Walters (1937)
- The Body in the Safe (1937)
- During Her Majesty's Pleasure (1938)
- Missing (1938)
- Miss X (1939)
- The Judge's Dilemma (1939)
- The Shadow over Fairholme (1940)
- The Girl Known as D13 (1940)
- Sweet Adversity (1941)
- The Price of Silence (1942)
- Love was Married (1943)

=== Short stories ===
- On the Giant's Head. The Novel Magazine, July 1915. Reprinted as by Roy Vickers. Detective Story Magazine, 28 October 1919

== As David Durham ==
- Hounded Down (1923)
- The Exploits of Fidelity Dove (1924)
- The Pearl-Headed Pin (1925)
- The Forgotten Honeymoon (1935)

== As John Spencer ==
- The Whispering Death (1932)
- Swell Garrick (1933)
