= Audrey Totter filmography =

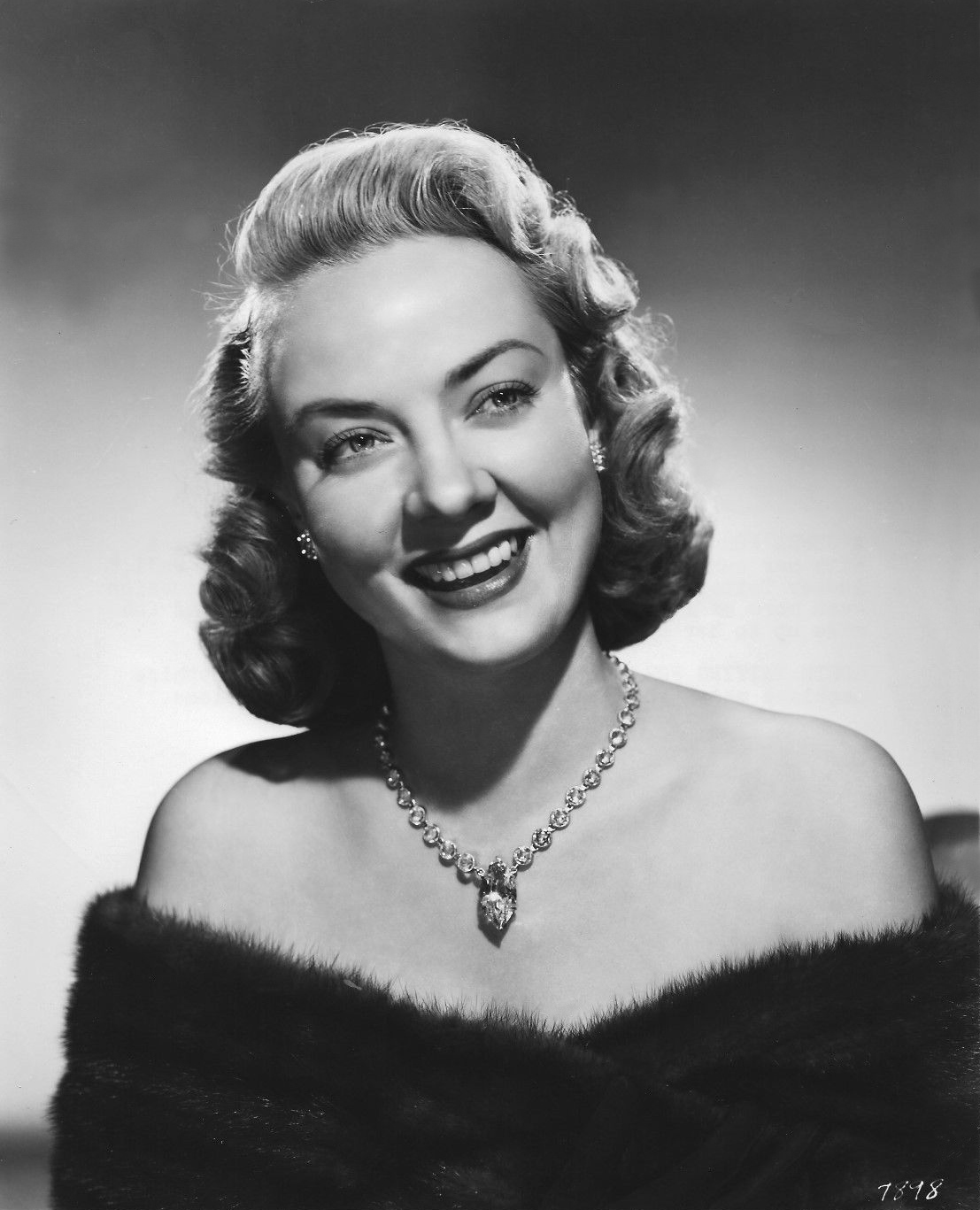

This is the complete filmography of actress Audrey Totter (December 20, 1917 – December 12, 2013). Originally a radio actress, she entered motion pictures in 1944 and became known for her portrayals of Femme fatales and hard-boiled dames. She is best remembered for her appearances in such features as Lady in the Lake (1947), The Unsuspected (1947), and The Set-Up (1949). She later found equal success in television with recurring roles on such syndicated sitcoms as Our Man Higgins, Cimarron City, Dr. Kildare, and Medical Center.

== Filmography and TV appearances ==
- 1945: Main Street After Dark as Jessie Belle Dibson
- 1945: Dangerous Partners as Lili Roegan
- 1945: Bewitched as Karen (voice, uncredited)
- 1945: Ziegfeld Follies as Phone Operator ('Number Please') (voice, uncredited)
- 1945: The Hidden Eye as Perfume Saleslady (uncredited)
- 1945: Her Highness and the Bellboy as Mildred (uncredited)
- 1945: The Sailor Takes a Wife as Lisa Borescu
- 1945: Adventure as Ethel (uncredited)
- 1946: The Postman Always Rings Twice as Madge Gorland
- 1946: The Cockeyed Miracle as Jennifer Griggs
- 1946: Lady in the Lake as Adrienne Fromsett
- 1946: The Secret Heart as Dinner Party Guest (voice, uncredited)
- 1947: The Beginning or the End as Jean O'Leary
- 1947: The Unsuspected as Althea Keane
- 1947: High Wall as Dr. Ann Lorrison
- 1948: The Saxon Charm as Alma Wragg
- 1949: Alias Nick Beal as Donna Allen
- 1949: The Set-Up as Julie
- 1949: Any Number Can Play as Alice Elcott
- 1950: Tension as Claire Quimby
- 1951: The Blue Veil as Helen Williams
- 1951: F.B.I. Girl as Shirley Wayne
- 1952: The Sellout as Cleo Bethel
- 1952: Assignment – Paris! as Sandy Tate
- 1952: My Pal Gus as Joyce Jennings
- 1953: Woman They Almost Lynched as Kate Quantrill
- 1953: Man in the Dark as Peg Benedict
- 1953: Cruisin' Down the River as Sally Jane Jackson
- 1953: Champ for a Day as Miss Peggy Gormley
- 1953: Mission Over Korea as Kate, Nurse-Lieutenant
- 1954: Four Star Playhouse (TV Series) as Lila Lamont
- 1954: Massacre Canyon as Flaxy
- 1954: The Whistler (TV Series) as Kay Fallon
- 1955: Women's Prison as Joan Burton
- 1955: A Bullet for Joey as Joyce Geary
- 1955: Science Fiction Theatre (TV Series) as Ellie Ferguson
- 1955: Fireside Theatre (TV Series)
- 1953–1955: The Ford Television Theatre (TV Series) as Breezy Adams / Joyce Evans
- 1955: The Vanishing American as Marion Warner
- 1956: Lux Video Theatre (TV Series) as Cheryl
- 1956: The 20th Century-Fox Hour (TV Series) as Ellen Benson
- 1956: Schlitz Playhouse (TV Series) as WAF Dietician
- 1956: Matinee Theatre (TV Series)
- 1956: Warner Brothers Presents (TV Series)
- 1956: Zane Grey Theater (TV Series) as Martha Phillips
- 1957: The Joseph Cotten Show (TV Series) as Ellen Parsons
- 1957: Ghost Diver as Anne Stevens
- 1957: The Californians (TV Series) as Dr. Louise Kendall
- 1958: Suspicion (TV Series) as Marie Farrell
- 1955–1958: Climax! (TV Series) as Anna Lederer / Dr. Helen Koenig / Edna Shaddick
- 1958: Cheyenne (TV Series) as Martha Fullerton
- 1958: Jet Attack as Tanya Nikova
- 1958: Man or Gun as Fran Dare
- 1958: Wagon Train (TV Series) as Goldie
- 1958: Lux Playhouse (TV Series)
- 1958–1959: Cimarron City (TV Series) as Beth Purcell (Recurring role, 21 episodes)
- 1957–1959: The Red Skelton Hour (TV Series) as Clara Appleby / Nancy Lump Lump
- 1959: Hawaiian Eye (TV Series) as Martha Gregory
- 1960: The Lineup (TV Series) as Mary
- 1960: The Ann Sothern Show (TV Series) as Lil
- 1960: The Loretta Young Show (TV Series) as Mrs. Page
- 1960: Alfred Hitchcock Presents (Season 5 Episode 24: "Madame Mystery") as Betsy Blake
- 1961: Alfred Hitchcock Presents (Season 6 Episode 32: "Self Defense") as Mrs. Phillips
- 1961: My Darling Judge (TV Movie)
- 1954–1961: General Electric Theater (TV Series) as Betsy Dunn / Olga Lemaire / Mary Lund / Ellen
- 1962: Route 66 (TV Series) as Babe Hunter
- 1962: Rawhide (TV Series) as Vada Nordquist
- 1962–1963: Our Man Higgins (TV Series) as Alice MacRoberts (Recurring role, 34 episodes)
- 1964: Kraft Suspense Theatre (TV Series) as Mrs. Myra Moran
- 1964: The Carpetbaggers as Prostitute
- 1964 Perry Mason (TV Series) as Reba Burgess
- 1965: Harlow as Marilyn
- 1965–1966: Dr. Kildare (TV Series) as Ella Vitnack / Norma Littell
- 1966: Bonanza (TV Series) as Beth Riley
- 1967: Chubasco as Theresa
- 1967: The Outsider (starring Darren McGavin) as Mrs. Bishop
- 1968: Run for Your Life (TV Series) as Dorothy Young
- 1969: Ironside (TV Series) as Norma Baum
- 1967–1969: The Virginian (TV Series) as Audry / Mrs. Archer
- 1970: The Bold Ones: The Lawyers (TV Series) as Edith Powell
- 1970: Insight (TV Series) as Mrs. Goddard
- 1973: Hawaii Five-O (TV Series) as Mrs. Royce
- 1975: Harry O (TV Series) as Mrs. Dante
- 1975: Police Story (TV Series) as Judge
- 1976: Matt Helm (TV Series) as Mrs. Simmons / Ellen's mom
- 1969–1976: Medical Center (TV Series) as Nurse Eve Wilcox
- 1978: The Nativity (TV Movie) as Elizabeth
- 1979: The Apple Dumpling Gang Rides Again as Martha Osten, Blind Cabin Widow
- 1980: The Great Cash Giveaway Getaway (TV Movie) as Judge
- 1984: City Killer (TV Movie) as Receptionist
- 1987: Murder, She Wrote (TV Series) as Sister Paul (final appearance)
