= The Lady in the Lake =

Novel by Raymond Chandler

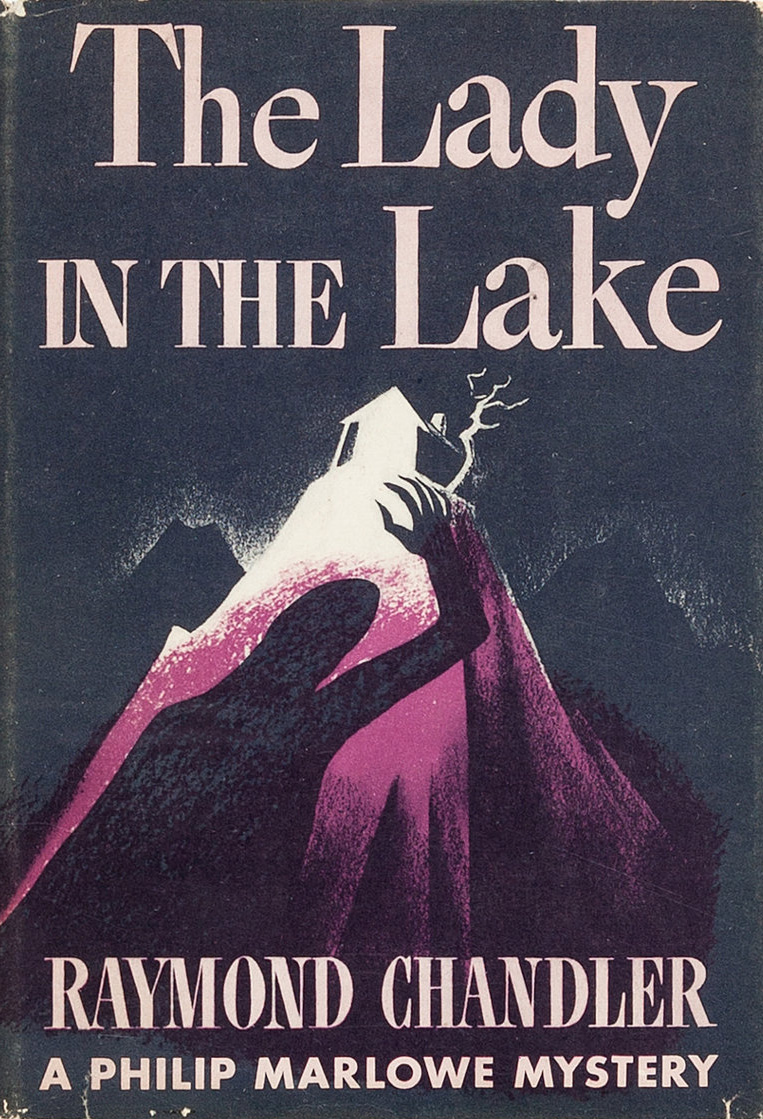
- Cover of the first edition
- Author: Raymond Chandler
- Cover artist: Norman Reeves
- Language: English
- Series: Philip Marlowe
- Genre: Detective, Crime, Novel
- Publisher: Alfred A. Knopf
- Publication date: 1943
- Publication place: United States
- Media type: Print (hardback and paperback)
- Pages: 216 pp
- Preceded by: The High Window
- Followed by: The Little Sister

The Lady in the Lake is a 1943 detective novel by Raymond Chandler featuring the Los Angeles private investigator Philip Marlowe. Notable for its removal of Marlowe from his usual Los Angeles environs for much of the book, the novel's complicated plot initially deals with the case of a missing woman in a small mountain town some 80 miles (130 km) from the city. The book was written shortly after the attack on Pearl Harbor (December 1941) and makes several references to the United States' then-recent involvement in World War II.

== Plot ==
Derace Kingsley, a wealthy businessman, hires Philip Marlowe to find his estranged wife, Crystal. Kingsley had received a telegram from Crystal about two weeks before, stating that she was divorcing him and marrying her gigolo boyfriend, Chris Lavery. But when Kingsley ran into him, Lavery had claimed that he had not seen her and did not know where she was.

Marlowe begins with a visit to Lavery in the neighbouring Bay City. But while watching Lavery's house, Marlowe is threatened by the tough police officer Al Degarmo, who suspects him of harassing Lavery's neighbour, Dr. Almore. Marlowe discovers that Almore's wife had died under suspicious circumstances and that her death was probably hushed up by the police.

Next Marlowe visits Kingsley’s vacation cabin at Little Fawn Lake with a note to the caretaker, Bill Chess. Chess is depressed over being abandoned by his wife, Muriel, at around the same time as Crystal disappeared. As Marlowe and Chess walk over the property, they discover a drowned body that Chess identifies as his wife by her clothes and jewellery. When Chess is arrested for her murder, Marlowe returns doubtfully to Los Angeles and on the way interviews some hotel employees. These remember a woman matching Crystal's description in the company of a man resembling Lavery.

Marlowe now returns to Bay City to interview Lavery again. At the house he finds Mrs. Fallbrook, who says she is the owner and has found a gun on the stairs. Once she has left, Marlowe discovers Lavery’s murdered body in the bathroom. He contacts Kingsley, who now offers him a bonus to prove Crystal did not do it.

After reporting the murder, Marlowe finds a note at his office from Kingsley's secretary, giving him the address of Dr. Almore's wife's parents. From them he learns that Almore's nurse was named Mildred Haviland and that they believe the doctor killed their daughter by drugging her and then putting her in the garage with the car motor running. The detective they hired was jailed for drunk driving and is not now in contact with them. After Marlowe goes to the detective's home and is rebuffed by the wife, he is followed by a police car. As with the detective before, the police force him to drink liquor and arrest him for speeding, resisting arrest and drunk driving.

Once Marlowe has established his innocence, he is phoned at his office by Kingsley, who tells him that Crystal has just called. She was begging for $500, so Kingsley gives Marlowe the money to deliver and he leaves wearing one of Kingsley’s scarves to the rendezvous. When he meets Crystal, Marlowe insists that she answer his questions before he hands over the money. Crystal agrees but only at a nearby apartment where she is staying. There Marlowe tells her he recognises her as Mrs. Fallbrook and accuses her of having killed Lavery. When she pulls a gun on Marlowe, someone hits him from behind with a sap.

Marlowe wakes up stinking of gin and finds Crystal lying naked, bloody and strangled to death on the bed. Soon the Bay City police are banging on the door. Lieutenant Degarmo says he believes Marlowe did not kill Crystal, but still wants to question him. Marlowe misleads Degarmo by showing him Kingsley's scarf, saying he found it next to the body. He and Degarmo then travel to Little Fawn Lake together to find Kingsley.

In their final confrontation at the cabin, Marlowe identifies the murdered woman, assumed to be Muriel Chess. She was actually Crystal Kingsley, killed by Mildred Haviland. Haviland, who had been Dr Almore's nurse and lover, had murdered his wife. Haviland later assumed the name Muriel and married Bill Chess. Having grown tired of Chess and scared that she might be found out, Haviland killed Crystal Kingsley and assumed her identity. She killed Lavery for his knowledge of Crystal. The murdered woman in Bay City was actually Haviland, killed by Al Degarmo, who was her former husband.

Degarmo attempts to escape but is killed while crossing a dam guarded by wartime sentries under orders to shoot potential saboteurs.

== Interpretations ==
Chandler wrote many of his novels by a process he called cannibalising his earlier short stories. He would take those previously published in pulp magazines and rework them so that they fitted together in one coherent whole. For The Lady in the Lake, Chandler drew on stories featuring his detective John Dalmas; the eponymous "The Lady in the Lake" (published in 1939); "Bay City Blues" (1938); and "No Crime in the Mountains" (1941).

The skillful patchworking impressed Jacques Barzun, who reported of the novel in his A Catalogue of Crime: "The exposition of the situation and character is done with remarkable pace and skill, even for Chandler. This superb tale moves through a maze of puzzles and disclosures to its perfect conclusion. Marlowe makes a greater use of physical clues and ratiocination in this exploit than in any other. It is Chandler's masterpiece."

The novel has also figured in fuller studies of Chandler’s work. One author comments that the book's title is an explicit reference to the Lady of the Lake, the enchantress of Arthurian romance, especially in making its focus a mysterious female who shifts between roles in different versions of the telling. This in turn mirrors the ambiguity between how the evidence seems to an observer and what has actually happened. The drowned lady in the lake shares the same looks and moral character as her murderer. The true distinction between them, of victim and perpetrator, only becomes clear at the conclusion of the novel. The ambiguity is further enhanced by the fact that each time the murderess is introduced into the action, she is masquerading under a different name. Mildred Haviland had disappeared after the killing of Dr Almore’s wife and then married Bill Chess, using the name Muriel; quitting that role, she impersonates Crystal Kingsley at the hotel in San Bernardino; and she throws Marlowe off the scent by introducing herself to him as Mrs Fallbrook, the owner of Chris Lavery’s apartment after his murder.

When the novel of 1943 was adapted to film in 1947, an experimental technique of cinematography was used to suggest the gap between the novel’s first-person narrative, representing subjective experience, and the reality that must be deduced from such ambiguous evidence. Marlowe the detective is not seen, except occasionally as a reflection in a mirror. Instead, the camera’s view takes his place and the cinema audience has to share his experience that way. Ultimately it was an unsatisfactory experiment since it provided a purely visual experience; the viewer could not share his heroic bouts with the whiskey bottle, could not defend himself from the invasive fist flung at the camera or evaluate the touch of siren or temptress. What the audience really shared with the narrator was “a disparity between the subjective’s promise and its fulfilment”, which is ultimately the reader’s experience of the written narrative, too.

== Adaptations ==
As well as the film of 1947, a 60-minute adaptation of the movie was broadcast on 9 February 1948 as part of Lux Radio Theater, with Robert Montgomery and Audrey Totter reprising their film roles. Radio adaptations of the novel were also broadcast in the UK: Bill Morrison’s as part of The BBC Presents: Philip Marlowe on 7 November 1977; and Stephen Wyatt’s for BBC Radio 4 on 12 February 2011.
