= Lay On, Mac Duff! =

1942 novel

- Author: Charlotte Armstrong
- Language: English
- Series: MacDougal Duff
- Genre: Mystery
- Publisher: Coward-McCann
- Publication date: 1942
- Publication place: United States
- Media type: Print
- Followed by: The Case of the Weird Sisters

Lay On, Mac Duff! is a 1942 mystery novel by the American writer Charlotte Armstrong. It was first published in New York by Coward-McCann, an imprint of Putnam. The first of a trilogy featuring amateur detective MacDougal Duff, it was followed by The Case of the Weird Sisters (1943) and The Innocent Flower (1945). The title is a punning reference to both the protagonist's name and a line from William Shakespeare's Macbeth, with the following two titles in the trilogy also referring to the play. It was Armstrong's debut novel, following two Broadway plays that made no great impact.

== Bibliography ==
- Cypert, Rick. The Virtue of Suspense: The Life and Works of Charlotte Armstrong. Associated University Press, 2008.
- Reilly, John M. Twentieth Century Crime & Mystery Writers. Springer, 2015.
