= The Case of the Weird Sisters =

1943 novel

- Author: Charlotte Armstrong
- Language: English
- Series: MacDougal Duff
- Genre: Mystery
- Publisher: Coward-McCann
- Publication date: 1943
- Publication place: United States
- Media type: Print
- Preceded by: Lay On, Mac Duff!
- Followed by: The Innocent Flower

The Case of the Weird Sisters is a 1943 mystery thriller novel by the American writer Charlotte Armstrong. It was first published in New York by Coward-McCann, an imprint of Putnam. It was the second in a trilogy featuring amateur detective MacDougal Duff, preceded by Lay On, Mac Duff! and followed by The Innocent Flower.

== Adaptation ==
In 1948 it was adapted into the British film The Three Weird Sisters directed by Daniel Birt and starring Nancy Price, Raymond Lovell and Nova Pilbeam. Produced by British National Films, it shifted the setting from America to Wales and removed the character of MacDougal Duff.

== Bibliography ==
- Cypert, Rick. The Virtue of Suspense: The Life and Works of Charlotte Armstrong. Associated University Press, 2008.
- Goble, Alan. The Complete Index to Literary Sources in Film. Walter de Gruyter, 1999.
- Reilly, John M. Twentieth Century Crime & Mystery Writers. Springer, 2015.
