= The Three Weird Sisters =

1948 British film by Daniel Birt

- UK release poster
- Directed by: Daniel Birt
- Written by: Dylan Thomas; David Evans; Louise Birt
- Based on: The Case of the Weird Sisters by Charlotte Armstrong
- Produced by: Louis H. Jackson
- Starring: Nancy Price; Mary Clare; Mary Merrall; Raymond Lovell; Nova Pilbeam
- Cinematography: Ernest Palmer; Moray Grant
- Edited by: Monica Kimick
- Music by: Hans May
- Production company: British National Films
- Distributed by: Associated British-Pathé
- Release date: 12 July 1948
- Running time: 82 minutes
- Country: United Kingdom
- Language: English

The Three Weird Sisters is a 1948 British melodrama film directed by Daniel Birt and starring Nancy Price, Mary Clare, Mary Merrall, Nova Pilbeam and Raymond Lovell. The film has Gothic influences. The screenplay was adapted by Dylan Thomas and Louise Birt from the 1943 novel The Case of the Weird Sisters by Charlotte Armstrong (mistitled The Case of the Three Weird Sisters in the opening credits). The film was Birt's feature film directorial debut. It also marked the last screen appearance of Nova Pilbeam, who retired from acting after it was completed.

== Plot ==
The elderly Morgan-Vaughan sisters Gertrude, Maude and Isobel live in a decaying and claustrophobic mansion in a Welsh mining village. Gertrude is blind, Maude is almost deaf and Isobel is crippled by arthritis. The coalmine from which the family made their fortune is almost worked out, and its tunnels and shafts are dangerously unstable. When a section of the underground workings collapses, destroying a row of local cottages and unsettling the foundations of the mansion, the sisters feel honour-bound to finance repairs, but do not have the means to do so.

The sisters' younger half-brother Owen, who left the village as a young man to pursue his education and has subsequently become a wealthy businessman in London, is sent for on the assumption that he will provide the necessary finances. Owen and his secretary Claire arrive from London to a cold reception. The somewhat simple-minded Thomas throws a stone that strikes Owen in the head as they drive up, and Mabli Hughes openly voices his contempt for Owen. The sisters are disconcerted to discover that he feels no sense of responsibility towards either them or the community and has no interest in contributing any money.

Dr David Davies recommends that Owen avoid driving for a day, so he and Claire stay the night. Strange events start to happen and eventually convince Claire that the sisters are plotting to murder Owen in order to lay hands on his money. She tries to alert other residents of the village to her suspicions, but at first is not taken seriously. Gradually, however, the doctor comes round to Claire's point of view and deduces that there is indeed a plot, instigated by the dominant Maude.

== Cast ==
- Nancy Price as Gertrude Morgan-Vaughan
- Mary Clare as Maude Morgan-Vaughan
- Mary Merrall as Isobel Morgan-Vaughan
- Nova Pilbeam as Claire Prentiss
- Anthony Hulme as Dr. David Davies
- Raymond Lovell as Owen Morgan-Vaughan
- Elwyn Brook-Jones as Thomas
- Edward Rigby as Waldo
- Hugh Griffith as Mabli Hughes
- Marie Ault as Beattie
- David Davies as Police Sergeant
- Hugh Pryse as minister
- Frank Crawshaw as bank manager
- Frank Dunlop as Ben
- Lloyd Pearson as solicitor
- Doreen Richards as Mrs. Probert
- Bartlett Mullins as dispenser

== Production ==
It was one of the last films made by British National Pictures.

== Reception ==
The Monthly Film Bulletin wrote: "This is not cinema material. It is heavy melodrama, dated and repetitive. The plot of the story is weak, and direction and editing have done little to tidy up the rough edges, although the actual sets are good. It is an actor's film and the performances by Nancy Price, Mary Merrall and Mary Clare as the three sisters, by Raymond Lovell as Owen, and by Elwyn BrookJ-ones as an idiot, weave a pattern which shapes what might otherwise have been a tedious story into a film of considerable dramatic skill."

Kine Weekly wrote: "Gripping and engrossing romantic melodrama, skilfully brewed from the eerie inhibitions of three eccentric and homicidal sisters. The acting, direction, dialogue and atmosphere are much above the average and deftly lighten its twisted, yet, oddly enough, human tale with neat touches of natural sentiment and humour without injury to its essential macabre. Psychologically and pathologically plausible, its full-strength Grand Guignol should thrill the family and the crowd."

Variety wrote: "There is more than the usual stock ingredients in this horror story. The dark doings in a rackety Welsh mansion are told intelligently and with suspense. There is a cumulative effect about it and the film is simple and satisfying in scripting and characterization."
