= Harlow (Magna film) =

1965 film by Alex Segal

- Theatrical release poster
- Directed by: Alex Segal
- Written by: Karl Tunberg
- Produced by: Lee Savin
- Starring: Carol Lynley; Efrem Zimbalist Jr.; Barry Sullivan; Hurd Hatfield; Lloyd Bochner; Hermione Baddeley; Audrey Totter; John Williams; Michael Dante; Jack Kruschen; Ginger Rogers
- Cinematography: Jim Kilgore
- Edited by: Bill Heath; Leo H. Shreve
- Music by: Al Ham; Nelson Riddle
- Production company: Electronovision
- Distributed by: Magna Distribution Corporation
- Release date: May 14, 1965 (New York City)
- Running time: 109 minutes
- Country: United States
- Language: English

Harlow is a 1965 American drama film directed by Alex Segal and written by Karl Tunberg. It is a fictionalized account of the life of actress Jean Harlow and stars Carol Lynley in the title role. The cast also features Efrem Zimbalist Jr., Barry Sullivan, Hurd Hatfield, Lloyd Bochner, Hermione Baddeley, Audrey Totter, John Williams, Michael Dante, Jack Kruschen, and Ginger Rogers in her final film.

The film was produced by Electronovision and distributed by Magna Distribution Corporation, both of which would be defunct within a year after the film's release.

Paramount Pictures also released a film about Harlow titled Harlow, starring Carroll Baker, five weeks after Magna's release.

== Plot ==
Noticing Jean Harlow in the background of a Laurel and Hardy film, actor Marc Peters tips off studio mogul Jonathan Martin, who arranges a screen test. Harlow becomes an overnight success. She is not a trained actor and is mocked by experienced actor William Mansfield, but her sex appeal makes her a Hollywood star.

Harlow's mother Mama Jean quickly capitalizes on her daughter's money and fame. Family and studio demands unnerve Harlow, as does her impulsive wedding to the impotent and suicidal Paul Bern. Harlow has many unhappy affairs and becomes depressed. But veteran actress Marie Dressler persuades her to take her profession more seriously, so Harlow goes back East to study her craft. When she returns home, Hollywood mogul Louis B. Mayer is impressed, as is Mansfield, who falls in love with her. However, Harlow dies in 1937.

== Cast ==
- Carol Lynley as Jean Harlow
- Efrem Zimbalist Jr. as William Mansfield
- Ginger Rogers as Mama Jean Bello
- Barry Sullivan as Marino Bello
- Hurd Hatfield as Paul Bern
- Lloyd Bochner as Marc Peters
- Hermione Baddeley as Marie Dressler
- Audrey Totter as Marilyn
- John Williams as Jonathan Martin
- Audrey Christie as Thelma
- Michael Dante as Ed
- Jack Kruschen as Louis B. Mayer
- Celia Lovsky as Maria Ouspenskaya
- Robert Strauss as Hank
- Sonny Liston as First Fighter

== Production ==
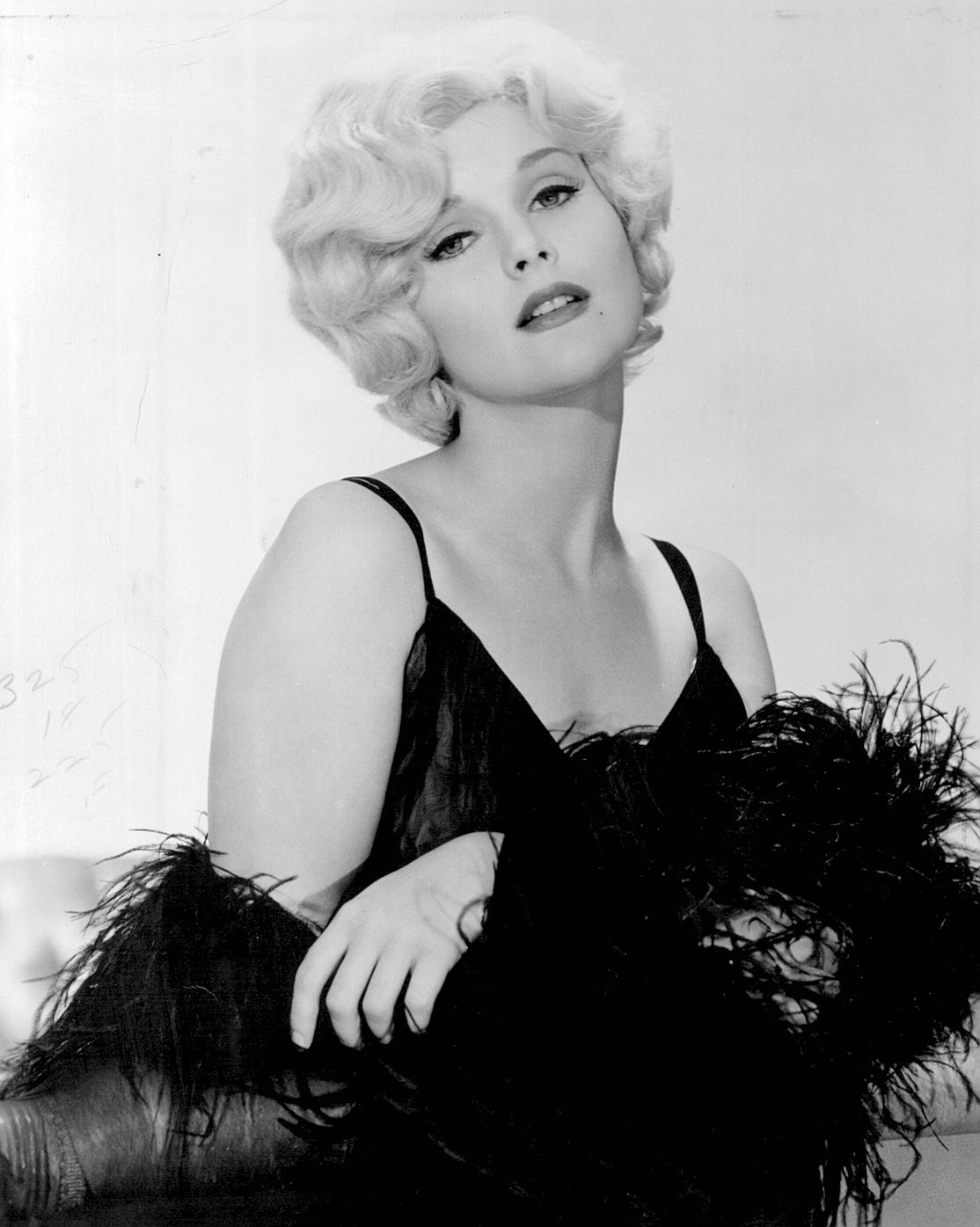
Carol Lynley as Jean Harlow

Judy Garland was originally cast in the role of Jean Harlow's mother, but left the film after just four days of shooting. She was replaced by Ginger Rogers.

The film was directed by television veteran Alex Segal and shot in the black-and-white Electronovision process, in which action was recorded on a videotape master that would later be transferred to film via kinescope for theatrical release. The film was produced by Electronovision, Inc., owners of the Electronovision process, and distributed by Magna Distribution Corporation.

Electronovision, Inc. was in such financial distress during the making of Harlow that actors' paychecks bounced and the Screen Actors Guild canceled its contracts with the company. According to producer Bill Sargent, the film from two days of shooting was mysteriously lost, the cast was not afforded sufficient time to rehearse and great difficulty was encountered when trying to find a laboratory to process the film's prints as well as suitable theaters for showings.

== Reception ==
In a contemporary review for The New York Times, critic Howard Thompson called the film "cheap, lusterless and excruciatingly dull" and a "bony, bargain-basement appraisal of famous, misguided and tragic young woman."

Harlow grossed approximately $2 million, but Electronovision, Inc. did not realize a profit after shares were paid to the film's distributors and investors, including actor Richard Burton.

== Paramount film ==
Harlow was released just five weeks before Paramount's film and with a more limited release. Though Carol Lynley was closer to Jean Harlow's actual age than was Paramount's star Carroll Baker, this film failed to gain as much attention as did Paramount's big-budget version.

Efrem Zimbalist, Jr.'s character William Mansfield is based on William Powell, but the character does not appear in the Paramount feature.

Magna Pictures Corporation brought a $25.2 million (later reduced to $6.3 million) antitrust lawsuit against Paramount, alleging that Paramount had engaged in a nationwide campaign to boycott Magna's film. Paramount filed a counterclaim alleging unfair competition by Magna and Electronovision. Electronovision, Inc. folded just two months after the premiere of Harlow, and Magna was dissolved in 1966.

Ironically, Electronovision/Magna's Harlow premiered at New York's Paramount Theatre, although the theater was no longer owned by Paramount at the time.

== See also ==
- List of American films of 1965
