= Merci pour le Chocolat =

2000 film

- Film poster
- Directed by: Claude Chabrol
- Screenplay by: Claude Chabrol; Caroline Eliacheff
- Based on: The Chocolate Cobweb by Charlotte Armstrong
- Produced by: Marin Karmitz
- Starring: Isabelle Huppert; Jacques Dutronc; Anna Mouglalis
- Cinematography: Renato Berta
- Edited by: Monique Fardoulis
- Music by: Matthieu Chabrol
- Distributed by: MK2 Diffusion
- Release date: 25 October 2000
- Running time: 99 minutes
- Country: France
- Language: French
- Budget: $5.9 million
- Box office: $13.4 million

Merci pour le Chocolat, also known as Nightcap, is a 2000 French psychological thriller film directed by Claude Chabrol and starring Isabelle Huppert and Jacques Dutronc. The film is based on the novel The Chocolate Cobweb by Charlotte Armstrong.

== Plot ==
André Polonski is a virtuoso pianist of international renown. He first married Mika, owner of a Swiss chocolate company, but then left her for Lisbeth, with whom he had a son, Guillaume. When Lisbeth died in a car accident, he remarried Mika.

André wishes his son was more active, and showed more interest in things. Mika feels that André only cares about his music, abuses sleeping pills and neglects her. Still she tries to be a good homemaker and prepares a cup of chocolate for Guillaume every night.

The family's life is disrupted by the arrival of Jeanne, a young pianist, who might be André's daughter. Jeanne begins suspecting that Mika is poisoning Guillaume's chocolate and also has something to do with Lisbeth's death.

== Cast ==
- Isabelle Huppert as Marie-Claire 'Mika' Muller
- Jacques Dutronc as André Polonski
- Anna Mouglalis as Jeanne Pollet
- Rodolphe Pauly as Guillaume Polonski
- Brigitte Catillon as Louise Pollet
- Michel Robin as Dufreigne
- Mathieu Simonet as Axel
- Lydia Andrei as Lisbeth
- Véronique Alain as Madame le Maire
- Isolde Barth as Pauline
- Sibylle Blanc as Nathalie

== Reception ==
The film received generally positive reviews.

Variety called it "a treat, a delicious blend of perversity, playfulness and deadly passion concealed beneath the tranquil, moneyed surface of the Swiss bourgeoisie", and said it is "fit to stand alongside his [Chabrol's] late-'60s career highs."

Roger Ebert said that the film's appeal "is not in the somewhat creaky old poisoning plot, not in the hints of suppressed family secrets, not in the suspense about what will happen next" but in Huppert's enigmatic character which is "maddening, perverse and seductive."

The Guardian called it "an intriguing little film, playfully aware of its own contrivances" but "stylish and intelligent - maintaining just enough of a frisson to keep you on the edge of your seat."

The Los Angeles Times said the film "crackles with wit and elegance, humor and pathos."

Time Out called it "a dark, velvety film which masks the rough with the smooth and coats a bitter pill in a veneer of decadent French polish."

== See also ==
- Isabelle Huppert on screen and stage
