= The Innocent Flower =

1945 novel

- 1970 edition
- Author: Charlotte Armstrong
- Language: English
- Series: MacDougal Duff
- Genre: Mystery
- Publisher: Coward-McCann
- Publication date: 1945
- Publication place: United States
- Media type: Print
- Preceded by: The Case of the Weird Sisters

The Innocent Flower is a 1945 mystery novel by the American writer Charlotte Armstrong. It is the final part of her trilogy featuring the amateur detective MacDougal Duff and was published in New York by Coward-McCann, an imprint of Putnam. It was published in Britain under the alternative title Death Filled the Glass. After this trilogy, which was more in the style of the classic Golden Age story, she produced a stand-alone suspense novel The Unsuspected on the advice of her agents.

== Bibliography ==
- Cypert, Rick. The Virtue of Suspense: The Life and Works of Charlotte Armstrong. Associated University Press, 2008.
- Reilly, John M. Twentieth Century Crime & Mystery Writers. Springer, 2015.
