= Jayne Meadows =

American actress and author (1919–2015)

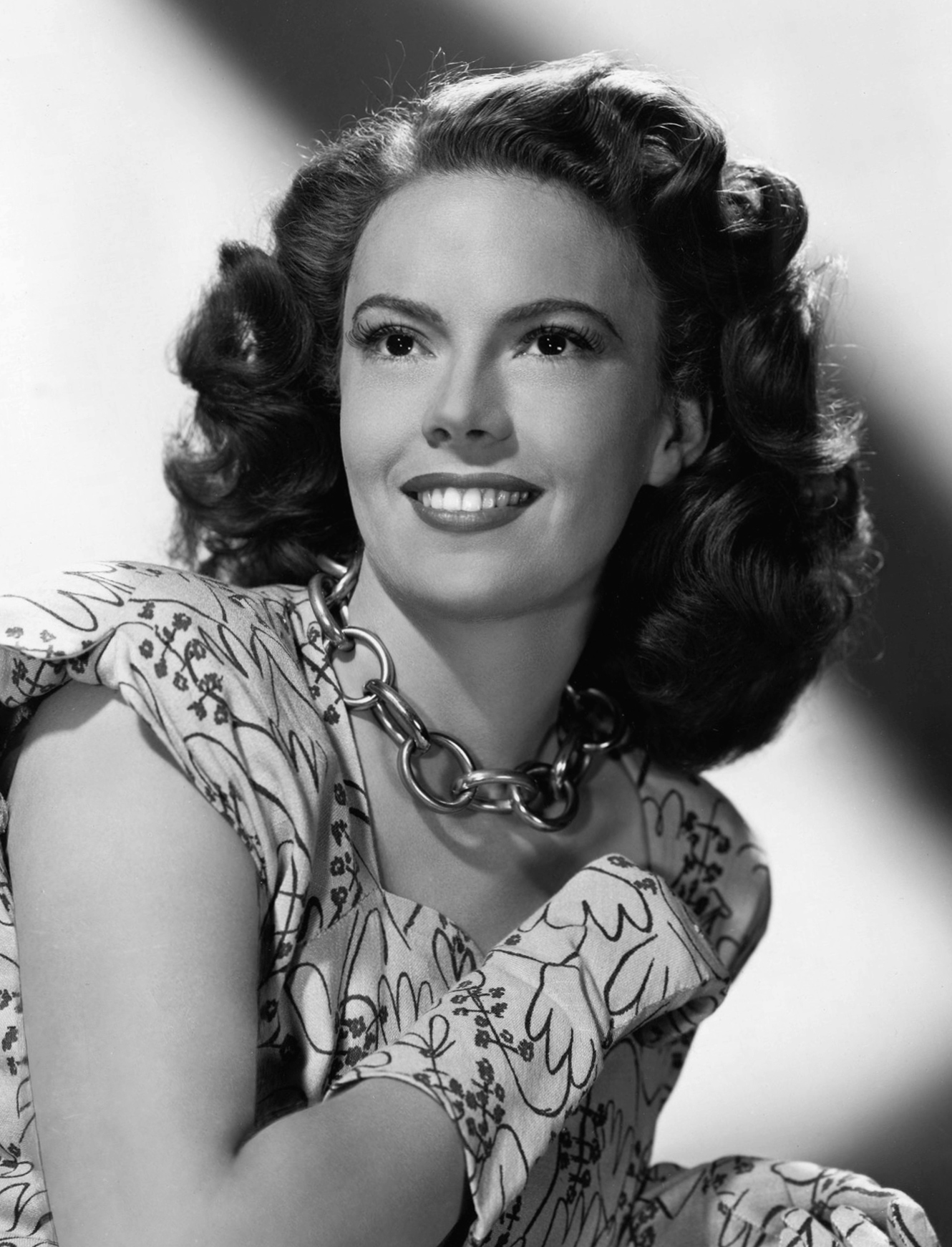
- Meadows in the 1940s
- Born: Jane Cotter; September 27, 1919; Wuchang District, Wuhan, China
- Died: April 26, 2015 (aged 95); Los Angeles, California, U.S.
- Resting place: Forest Lawn Memorial Park, Hollywood Hills, California
- Occupations: Actress, author
- Years active: 1941–2009
- Known for: Undercurrent; Song of the Thin Man; David and Bathsheba; Enchantment; Lady in the Lake
- Political party: Republican
- Spouses: Milton Krims (m. 1949; div. 1954); Steve Allen (m. 1954; died 2000)
- Children: 1
- Relatives: Audrey Meadows (sister)
- Website: jaynemeadows.com

Jayne Meadows (born Jane Cotter; September 27, 1919 – April 26, 2015) was an American stage, film and television actress, as well as an author and lecturer. She was nominated for three Emmy Awards during her career and was the wife of original Tonight Show host Steve Allen. She was the elder sister of actress, banker, and memoirist Audrey Meadows.

== Early life ==
Meadows was born Jane Cotter in 1919, in Wuchang, Wuhan, Hubei Province, China, the elder daughter of American Episcopal missionary parents, the Rev. Francis James Meadows Cotter and his wife, the former Ida Miller Taylor, who had married in 1915. Her younger sister was actress Audrey Meadows. She also had two older brothers. In the early 1930s, the family settled in Sharon, Connecticut, where her father had been appointed rector of Christ Church. Both she and her sister Audrey became residents of The Rehearsal Club in NYC when they struck out to seek their careers.

== Career ==
Metro-Goldwyn-Mayer signed Jane Cotter to a movie contract in 1944, giving her the professional name Jayne Meadows. ("Meadows" was a paternal family name.) She specialized in playing intense character roles as opposed to ingénues. Her most famous movies include: Undercurrent (with Katharine Hepburn), Song of the Thin Man (with William Powell and Myrna Loy), David and Bathsheba (with Gregory Peck, Susan Hayward, and Raymond Massey), Lady in the Lake (with Robert Montgomery and Audrey Totter), and Enchantment (with David Niven and Teresa Wright). Louella Parsons presented Meadows with the Cosmopolitan Award for Finest Dramatic Performance of 1949, for Enchantment.

Among her earliest television appearances, Meadows played reporter Helen Brady in a 1953 episode of Suspense opposite Walter Matthau titled "F.O.B. Vienna". She was a regular panelist on the original version of I've Got a Secret and an occasional panelist on To Tell The Truth and What's My Line?, the latter alongside husband Steve Allen. She also appeared on the NBC interview program Here's Hollywood. During the early days of the burgeoning live entertainment scene in Las Vegas, the Allens occasionally worked together as a nightclub act. The couple made several television appearances together. Allen's highly original series Meeting of Minds (1977–81) featured great names of history (Thomas Paine, Socrates, Catherine the Great, et al.) in a talk-show format. Allen insisted on casting his wife in most of the feminine roles, over her objections: "He came to me and he said, 'You're gonna play Cleopatra.' I said, 'I am not! Go away. Go away!' And he calmly said, 'It's a divorce if you don't play it.'" Meadows appeared nine times on the series, playing numerous historical characters (including Cleopatra, Marie Antoinette, Catherine the Great, Margaret Sanger, Elizabeth Barrett Browning, and Florence Nightingale).

In 1998, they played an argumentative elderly couple in an episode of Homicide: Life on the Street in which Allen's character accidentally shoots a man who was in the act of committing suicide (by jumping from the roof of the elderly couple's building). In 1999, the couple made their last joint TV appearance (again playing a couple) in the all-star episode of the Dick Van Dyke series Diagnosis: Murder, titled "The Roast", which marked Steve Allen's final screen appearance. She also appeared in City Slickers, as the telephone voice of Billy Crystal's character's over-protective and oversolicitous mother.

Steve Allen's series of ten humorous mystery novels (in part ghostwritten) that began with The Talk Show Murders (1982) cast Allen and Meadows in the roles of amateur detectives.

== Other ventures ==
Meadows owned a travel agency from at least 1964 until at least 1967.

== Later life and death ==
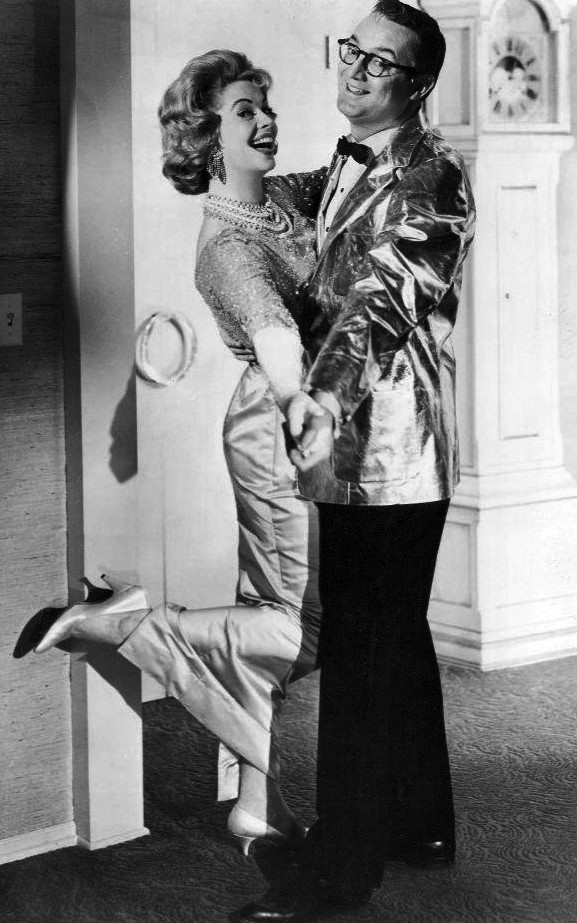
With husband Steve Allen in 1961

Meadows was first married to screenwriter Milton Krims from 1949 to 1954. She was later married to Steve Allen, from 1954 until his death in 2000. They had one son, Bill. Allen's three sons from his first marriage (Stephen Jr., Brian and David) are her stepsons.

Meadows was active in Republican affairs although Steve Allen was a Democrat. She was the recipient of several honorary Doctor of Humane Letters degrees from various universities.

She remained active until 2009, when she fell and fractured her hip. Her last public appearance was in August 2009 at the Early TV Memories First-Class Commemorative Stamp Dedication Ceremony. She died on April 26, 2015, of natural causes at her home in Encino, California, aged 95. She is buried at Forest Lawn Memorial Park in the Hollywood Hills, beside Steve Allen.
