= Dangerous Partners =

1945 film by Edward L. Cahn

- Theatrical release poster
- Directed by: Edward L. Cahn
- Screenplay by: Marion Parsonnet; Edmund L. Hartmann
- Story by: Oliver Weld Bayer
- Produced by: Arthur Field
- Starring: James Craig; Signe Hasso
- Cinematography: Karl Freund
- Edited by: Ferris Webster
- Music by: David Snell
- Production company: Metro-Goldwyn-Mayer
- Distributed by: Metro-Goldwyn-Mayer
- Release date: June 7, 1945
- Running time: 74 minutes
- Country: United States
- Language: English

Dangerous Partners is a 1945 American adventure film directed by Edward L. Cahn and written by Marion Parsonnet and Edmund L. Hartmann, based on the novel “Paper Chase” by Oliver Weld Bayer, the pen-name of Leo and Eleanor Bayer (later known as the screenwriter Eleanor Perry.) The film stars James Craig, Signe Hasso, Edmund Gwenn, Audrey Totter, Mabel Paige, John Warburton, Henry O'Neill and Grant Withers. The film was released on June 7, 1945, by Metro-Goldwyn-Mayer.

== Plot ==
Carola and Clyde Ballister find a briefcase containing four wills leaving $1-million bequests to an Albert Kingby. They visit the Cleveland home of the first person who wrote a will benefiting Kingsby, a man named Kempen. They meet his attorney, Jeff Caign, and learn Kempen intended to leave the money to a singer, Lili Roegan.

Kempen dies mysteriously, so the Ballisters take a train to go see Professor Ludlow, the next beneficiary. Caign tails them, discovers a dead Clyde, in Kingsby's compartment and becomes the crooked Carola's new partner.

The real Kingby turns up. He apparently is part of a Nazi group assisting war criminals. Carola and Caign, now lovers, go to New York City, where they are taken captive by Kingsby and pressured to reveal where the missing wills are. The police close in, kill Kingby but don't charge Carola and Caign, who are free to get on with their sordid lives.

== Cast ==
- James Craig as Jeff Caign
- Signe Hasso as Carola Ballister
- Edmund Gwenn as Albert Richard Kingby
- Audrey Totter as Lili Roegan
- Mabel Paige as Marie Drumman
- John Warburton as Clyde Ballister
- Henry O'Neill as Police Lt. Duffy
- Grant Withers as Jonathan Drumman
- Felix Bressart as Prof. Roland Ludlow
- Warner Anderson as Miles Kempen
- Stephen McNally as Co-pilot
- John Eldredge as Farrel

Harriet Lee was the voice double for Audrey Totter in her singing scene.
