= The Chocolate Cobweb =

1948 novel

- Author: Charlotte Armstrong
- Language: English
- Genre: Mystery thriller
- Publisher: Coward-McCann
- Publication date: 1948
- Publication place: United States
- Media type: Print

The Chocolate Cobweb is a 1948 mystery thriller novel by the American writer Charlotte Armstrong. It was first published in New York by Coward-McCann, an imprint of Putnam. Its first British publication came four years later in 1952. A French-language film adaptation of the novel, Merci pour le Chocolat, was released in 2000.

== Synopsis ==
A mix-up at the maternity hospital meant that Amanda Garth was nearly taken home by the wrong family, the celebrated painter Tobias Garrison. Twenty three years later after discovering this strange event, a curious Amanda goes to visit the Garrison household in California. Despite a warm welcome from Tobias she meets a more frosty reception from his son Thone, but it is the actions of Tobias' latest wife Ione that really alarms her. She uncovers what she believes is a plot to murder Thone by slipping him a lethal dose of poison amongst his hot chocolate.

Convinced that Ione is driven by a pathological jealousy of the artist's late wife Bella, the subject of several of his most celebrated paintings, Amanda ingratiates her way into the Garrison household. She gradually becomes convinced that Bella's death six years before was not accidental, and that Ione may be plotting to kill Bella's only son Thone. In the process, Amanda finds herself in great danger.

== Adaptation ==
Although Armstrong and her agent hoped one of the Hollywood studios would option and produce the story, no contemporary film adaptation was made. In 2000 it was made into a French film Merci pour le Chocolat directed by Claude Chabrol and starring Isabelle Huppert, Jacques Dutronc and Anna Mouglalis.

== Bibliography ==
- Cypert, Rick. The Virtue of Suspense: The Life and Works of Charlotte Armstrong. Associated University Press, 2008.
- Kay, Emma. A Dark History of Chocolate. Pen and Sword History, 2021
- Leigh, Jacob. The Late Films of Claude Chabrol: Genre, Visual Expressionism and Narrational Ambiguity. Bloomsbury Publishing USA, 2017.
- Reilly, John M. Twentieth Century Crime & Mystery Writers. Springer, 2015.
