= Hurd Hatfield =

American actor (1917–1998)

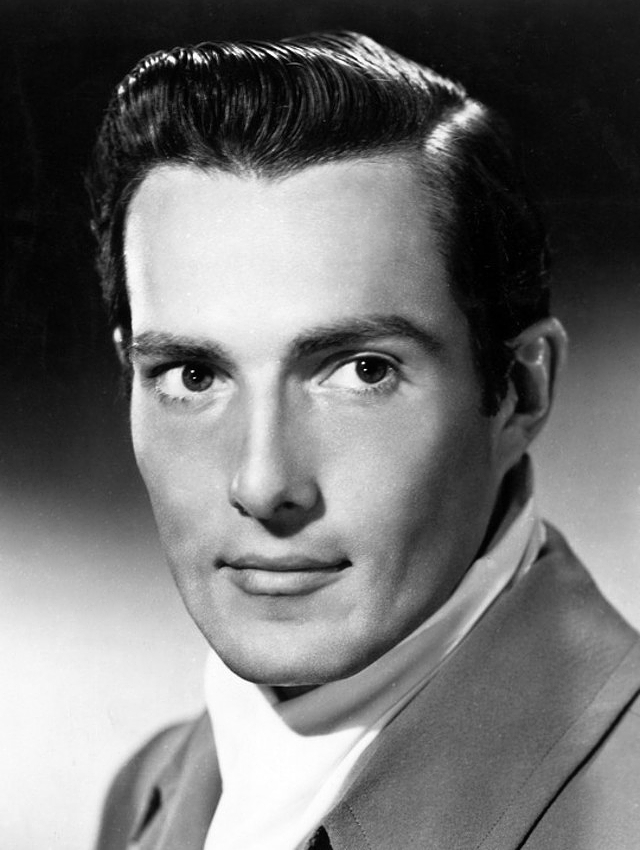
- Publicity photo of Hatfield, 1945
- Born: William Rukard Hurd Hatfield; December 7, 1917; New York City, U.S.
- Died: December 26, 1998 (aged 81); Rathcormac, County Cork, Ireland
- Occupation: Actor
- Years active: 1941–1991
- Notable work: The Picture of Dorian Gray (1945)

William Rukard Hurd Hatfield (December 7, 1917 – December 26, 1998) was an American actor. He was known for playing handsome, narcissistic young men, most notably Dorian Gray in the film The Picture of Dorian Gray (1945).

== Early life ==
Hatfield was born in New York City to William Henry Hatfield (died 1954), an attorney who served as deputy attorney general for New York, and his wife, Adele. He graduated from Boonton High School in 1937 and was inducted in 1996 as a member of the school's inaugural hall of fame. He was educated at Columbia University, then moved to London, where he studied drama and began acting in theatre.

== Career ==
Hatfield returned to the U.S. for his film debut in Dragon Seed (1944), in which he and his co-stars (Katharine Hepburn, Akim Tamiroff, Aline MacMahon, Turhan Bey) portrayed Chinese peasants, some more convincingly than others. Hatfield's second film, The Picture of Dorian Gray (1945), made him a star. As Oscar Wilde's ageless anti-hero, Hatfield received widespread acclaim for his dark good looks as much as for his acting ability. However, the actor was ambivalent about the role and his performance. "The film didn't make me popular in Hollywood," he commented later. "It was too odd, too avant-garde, too ahead of its time. The decadence, the hints of bisexuality and so on, made me a leper! Nobody knew I had a sense of humour, and people wouldn't even have lunch with me."

His follow-up films, The Diary of a Chambermaid (1946), The Beginning or the End (1947), and The Unsuspected (1947), were successful, but Joan of Arc (1948) was a critical and financial failure. Hatfield's film career began to lose momentum very quickly in the 1950s, and he returned to the stage. His subsequent movies included supporting roles in The Left Handed Gun (1958), King of Kings (as Pontius Pilate) (1961), El Cid (1961), Harlow (1965) (as Paul Bern), and The Boston Strangler (1968). He cut back on performing in the 1970s. His later movies included King David (1985) and Her Alibi (1989).

He appeared frequently on television and received an Emmy Award nomination for the Hallmark Hall of Fame videotaped play The Invincible Mr. Disraeli (1963). In 1957, he appeared in Beyond This Place, directed by Sidney Lumet. Hatfield's other television credits include three guest appearances on Murder, She Wrote opposite his Picture of Dorian Gray costar Angela Lansbury, who had become a lifelong friend, and who had a home in County Cork. He also appeared as the villain in the second episode of Voyage to the Bottom of the Sea, titled "The City Beneath the Sea". He appeared in Alfred Hitchcock Presents in "None Are So Blind", which first aired October 28, 1956.

In 1952, Hatfield appeared as Joseph in Westinghouse Studio One's The Nativity. This was a rare commercial network staging of a 14th-century mystery play, adapted from the York and Chester plays.

In 1966, he appeared on the television series The Wild Wild West in an episode titled "The Night of the Man-Eating House". In a twist on his Dorian role, his character starts as an old man who, upon entering a house inhabited by the ghost of his mother, is turned back into a youthful Confederate soldier. A second appearance in the third season episode "The Night of the Undead" had him portray the vengeful and mad Dr. Articulus.

According to the magazine Films in Review, Hatfield was ambivalent about having played Dorian Gray, feeling that it had typecast him. "You know, I was never a great beauty in Gray...and I never understood why I got the part and have spent my career regretting it", he is reported to have said.

== Personal life and death ==
Having been introduced to Ireland by actress and former co-star Angela Lansbury, Hatfield lived at Ballinterry House, Rathcormac, County Cork from the early 1970s. He purchased the structure to save it from demolition and he spent 24 years restoring and renovating it. A keen collector of antiques and art, he referred to Ballinterry House as a painting which he never would finish. He died in his sleep of a heart attack at a friend's home, aged 81, after celebrating Christmas dinner.

Hatfield never married. His long-time close friend and colleague Maggie Williams was heir of both Ballinterry House and his collection. She maintained the historic Irish country home exactly as it was at the time of Hatfield's death. The house was sold in late 2006, and the entire contents of the Hurd Hatfield Collection were sold at an auction on the premises by Country House Antique & Fine Art Auction in March 2007.

At the time of his death, Hatfield was writing his autobiography. He was cremated, and his ashes scattered.

Hatfield performed several times in the Soviet Union and developed a deep interest in Russian culture and religion. His interest ran so deep that on his deathbed, a Russian Orthodox priest attended him and officiated at his funeral.

== Selected filmography ==
- Dragon Seed (1944) – Lao San Tan – Youngest Son
- The Picture of Dorian Gray (1945) – Dorian Gray
- The Diary of a Chambermaid (1946) – Georges Lanlaire
- The Beginning or the End (1947) – Dr. John Wyatt
- The Unsuspected (1947) – Oliver Keane
- The Checkered Coat (1948) – Steve 'Creepy' Bolin
- Joan of Arc (1948) – Father Pasquerel (Joan's chaplain)
- Chinatown at Midnight (1949) – Clifford Ward
- Destination Murder (1950) – Stretch Norton
- Tarzan and the Slave Girl (1950) – Prince of the Lionians
- Alfred Hitchcock Presents (TV Series) (1956) (Season 1 Episode 24: "The Perfect Murder") – Paul Tallendier
- Alfred Hitchcock Presents (TV Series) (1956) (Season 2 Episode 5: "None Are So Blind") – Seymour Johnston
- The Left Handed Gun (1958) – Moultrie
- King Of Kings (1961) – Pontius Pilate
- El Cid (1961) – Arias
- Héroes de blanco (1962)
- Harlow (1965) – Paul Bern
- Mickey One (1965) – Ed Castle
- Lamp At Midnight (1966) – Sagredo Niccolini

1967 - Wild Wild West : Liston Day

- The Boston Strangler (1968) – Terence Huntley
- Von Richthofen and Brown (1971) – Anthony Fokker
- The Word (1978) – Cedric Plummer
- King David (1985) – Ahimelech
- Crimes of the Heart (1986) – Old Granddaddy
- Her Alibi (1989) – Troppa
