= The Nativity (television drama) =

1952 television film by Franklin J. Schaffner

The Nativity was a 58-minute United States television drama with music about the birth of Jesus Christ, presented on the television anthology Westinghouse Studio One. Directed by Franklin Schaffner, it is a rare modern network television production of an authentic mystery play, mostly culled from the York and Chester mystery plays of the 14th and 15th centuries in England. The adaptation was by Andrew Allan. The presentation, originally telecast live the evening of December 22, 1952 on CBS, has been preserved on kinescope. It has been issued in several DVD public domain versions. It can also be seen complete online on Internet Archive.

The play was performed in what is now known as Elizabethan English. Although it takes its text straight from fifteenth-century English, the words were not pronounced as Middle English would be, but in a more modern manner. Musical selections were selected from Christmas carols and sung by the Robert Shaw Chorale. The cast included Thomas Chalmers, Paul Tripp, and Miriam Wolfe. Hurd Hatfield serves as narrator.

== See also ==
- List of Christmas films
