= The Black-Eyed Stranger =

1951 novel

- Author: Charlotte Armstrong
- Language: English
- Genre: Mystery suspense
- Publisher: Coward-McCann
- Publication date: 1951
- Publication place: United States
- Media type: Print

The Black-Eyed Stranger is a 1951 mystery thriller novel by the American writer Charlotte Armstrong. It was first published in New York by Coward-McCann, an imprint of Putnam. Armstrong later identified it as one of her favorite books. Despite her hopes that it might be adapted into a film, as several of her earlier works had been, it was not ultimately optioned by Hollywood studios although Alfred Hitchcock had expressed interest in it along with her previous novel Mischief.

== Synopsis ==
Crime reporter Sam Lynch discovers a plot to kidnap heiress Kay Salisbury. He takes matters into his own hands to try and prevent this.

== Bibliography ==
- Cypert, Rick. The Virtue of Suspense: The Life and Works of Charlotte Armstrong. Associated University Press, 2008.
- Reilly, John M. Twentieth Century Crime & Mystery Writers. Springer, 2015.
