= The Unsuspected (novel) =

1946 novel

- First edition
- Author: Charlotte Armstrong
- Language: English
- Genre: Mystery thriller
- Publisher: Coward-McCann
- Publication date: 1946
- Publication place: United States
- Media type: Print

The Unsuspected is a mystery thriller novel by the American writer Charlotte Armstrong. It was originally serialized in the Saturday Evening Post in 1945 before being published in book form by Coward-McCann the following year. Armstrong's previous three books had been a trilogy featuring the amateur detective MacDougal Duff, but she abandoned the character on the advice of her agent and produced a stand-alone suspense novel.

== Synopsis ==
Rosaleen, the secretary of celebrated former theatre and film director and current radio star Luther Grandison, is found hanging in his Connecticut house in an apparent suicide. Francis, her fiancee and Jane her cousin both reject this verdict. To discover more, Jane takes a job as Grandison's new secretary while Francis poses as the husband of his wealthy ward Matilda who disappeared at sea several weeks before.

Things take an additional turn when Matilda turns up, having been rescued from the sinking ship, and flatly doesn't recognize Francis as her husband followed by an additional suspicious suicide of Grandison's niece, the beautiful Althea. As Francis and Jane try to uncover the truth they are aware of the increasing danger for all of them.

== Film adaptation ==
In 1947 the novel was adapted into a film of the same title produced by Warner Brothers. It was directed by Michael Curtiz and starred Claude Rains, Joan Caulfield and Audrey Totter.

== Bibliography ==
- Cypert, Rick. The Virtue of Suspense: The Life and Works of Charlotte Armstrong. Associated University Press, 2008.
- Goble, Alan. The Complete Index to Literary Sources in Film. Walter de Gruyter, 1999.
- Miller, Ron. Mystery Classics on Film: The Adaptation of 65 Novels and Stories. McFarland, 2017.
- Reilly, John M. Twentieth Century Crime & Mystery Writers. Springer, 2015.
