= A Dram of Poison =

1956 novel by Charlotte Armstrong

- Author: Charlotte Armstrong
- Language: English
- Genre: Mystery thriller
- Publisher: Coward-McCann
- Publication date: 1956
- Publication place: United States
- Media type: Print

A Dram of Poison is a 1956 mystery novel by the American author Charlotte Armstrong. It was first published in New York by Coward-McCann, an imprint of Putnam. The title is a line from William Shakespeare's Romeo and Juliet. It was awarded an Edgar Award by the Mystery Writers of America. Although considered for screen adaptation, no film was ultimately produced.

== Bibliography ==
- Cypert, Rick. The Virtue of Suspense: The Life and Works of Charlotte Armstrong. Associated University Press, 2008.
- Reilly, John M. Twentieth Century Crime & Mystery Writers. Springer, 2015.
