= Charlotte Armstrong =

American writer (1905–1969)

- Born: May 2, 1905; Vulcan, Michigan, U.S.
- Died: July 18, 1969 (aged 64); Glendale, California, U.S.
- Education: Barnard College; University of Wisconsin
- Spouse: Joseph Lewi (m. 1928)
- Children: 3
- Writing career
- Pen name: Jo Valentine
- Genres: Mystery; suspense
- Notable awards: Edgar Award; 1957 A Dram of Poison

Charlotte Armstrong Lewi (May 2, 1905 – July 18, 1969) was an American writer. Under the names Charlotte Armstrong and Jo Valentine she wrote 29 novels, as well as short stories, plays, and screenplays. She also worked for The New York Times' advertising department, as a fashion reporter for Breath of the Avenue (a buyer's guide), and in an accounting firm. Additionally, she worked for the New Yorker magazine, publishing only three poems for them.

== Personal life ==
Born as Charlotte Armstrong on May 2, 1905 in Vulcan, Michigan. She was the daughter of mining engineer Frank Hall Armstrong and Clara Pascoe Armstrong. She graduated from Vulcan High School in Vulcan, Michigan in June 1921 just after she turned 16 years old. She attended the junior college program at Ferry Hall in Lake Forest, Illinois, for one year (1921–1922), during which time she served as editor of the student publication, Ferry Tales. She attended the University of Wisconsin for two years and received a Bachelor of Arts degree from Barnard College in 1925. During her time at The New York Times, she met Joseph (Jack) Lewi, whom she married in 1928. She had a daughter and two sons.

== Career ==
Armstrong's publications generally followed one of two tracks. All of her novels were published by Coward-Mccan, even The Protege, which was published posthumously. Armstrong's short stories, however, were published in magazines. Most of these stories were published in Ellery-Queen's Mystery Magazine, but some others were published in The Saturday Evening Post and Argosy magazine.

In September 1952, Armstrong's fantasy novella, Three Day Magic (1948) was published in longer form in The Magazine of Fantasy and Science Fiction. The long version was reprinted in the 1979 anthology, Mysterious Visions, by Martin H. Greenberg, Joseph Olander, and Charles G. Waugh. The editors remarked in their introduction that it was a "powerful and almost forgotten novella" that demonstrated that, although the well-known mystery writer was "most famous for suspense and style," she could have "become equally famous for humor and style."

== Style and themes ==
In 1939, while living in Cape Cod, Massachusetts, Charlotte Armstrong began her career as a writer with the plays The Happiest Days and Ring Around Elizabeth. Both made it to Broadway, but The Happiest Days flopped, and Ring Around Elizabeth did not perform well either. This lack of success prompted Armstrong to shift to mystery fiction with Lay On, Mac Duff! (1942), The Case of the Weird Sisters (1943) and The Innocent Flower (1945), a trilogy featuring detective MacDougal Duff. Her successful entrance into suspense with The Unsuspected was a boost to her career, and soon she was recognized as pioneer of domestic suspense. Later adapted into the film Talk About a Stranger, Charlotte Armstrong's 1951 novel The Enemy is a good example of Armstrong work in the genre.

Many of Armstrong's novels, such as The Enemy, also include hidden political allegories. In these stories, characters group into mobs to try to solve the mysteries. Mobs tend to jump to the first proposed conclusion, and in the process ignore any contradictions. Around the same time, fear of Communist influence in American institutions and the infiltration of Soviet spies started the McCarthy era. During this time, hundreds of Americans were accused of being communist or working with communists, some of them on questionable and exaggerated evidence, leading to sometimes undeservedly destroyed careers and unemployment. In The Enemy, mob rule is prevalent as people ignored evidence, paralleling McCarthyism as it dominated politics at the time. These elements of McCarthyism are also present in her 1951 novel Mischief, which was adapted into the film Don't Bother to Knock, directed by Roy Baker.

== Legacy ==
In recognition of her work, the house which Armstrong moved to and lived in until death in Glendale, California, became known as the "Charlotte Armstrong House." In 1965, the Howard Gotlieb Archival Research Center reached out to Armstrong and requested to be the repository of all of her works. Armstrong obliged and now the Gotlieb Center serves as the best body for retrieving any of Armstrong's works. Furthermore, around 1956, Armstrong and her family put together a collection of works about her and her family, titled, Charlotte Armstrong, A Master Storyteller Remembered.

It seems Armstrong was not able to finish her own autobiography due to her early passing, but in 2008, Rick Cypert authored a biography of Armstrong which dictated her personal and professional life titled The Virtue of Suspense: The Life and Works of Charlotte Armstrong. Additionally, Mysterious Press made 13 of Armstrong's novels accessible by e-book.

== Awards ==
In 1957, Armstrong received an Edgar Award from the Mystery Writers of America for her novel A Dram of Poison. She wrote two other Edgar-nominated novels: The Gift Shop (1966) and Lemon in the Basket (1967). Three of her short stories, all published in Ellery Queen's Mystery Magazine, were nominated for Edgars: "And Already Lost" (1957), "The Case for Miss Peacock" (1965), and "The Splintered Monday" (1966).

== Publications ==
- The Happiest Days, 1939 (play)
- Ring Around Elizabeth, 1941 (play)
- Lay On, Mac Duff! 1942 (first in the MacDougal Duff series)
- The Case of the Weird Sisters, 1943 (second in the MacDougal Duff series)
- The Innocent Flower, 1945 (also known as Death Filled the Glass) (third and last in the MacDougal Duff series)
- The Unsuspected, 1946, Coward-McCann
- The Chocolate Cobweb, 1948
- Fatal Lady, 1950
- Mischief, 1950
- The Black-Eyed Stranger, 1951
- Catch-as-Catch-Can, 1953 (also known as Walk Out on Death)
- The Trouble in Thor, 1953 (as Jo Valentine; also known as And Sometimes Death)
- The Better to Eat You, 1954 (also known as Murder's Nest)
- A Gun is a Nervous Thing, 1955
- The Dream Walker, 1955 (also known as Alibi for Murder)
- A Dram of Poison, 1956
- And Already Lost..., 1957 (short story)
- The Albatross, 1957 (short story collection)

- "The Albatross"
- "The Enemy"
- "Laugh It Off"
- "What Would You Have Done?"
- "All the Way Home"
- "The Evening Hour"
- "The Hedge Between"
- "Ten Points for Mr. Polkinghorn"
- "Miss Murphy"
- "Ride with the Executioner"

- Incident at a Corner, 1957
- Something Blue, 1959
- The Seventeen Widows of San Souci, 1959
- The Girl with a Secret, 1959
- The Ring in the Fish, 1959
- Then Came Two Women, 1962
- The One-Faced Girl, 1963
- The Mark of the Hand, 1963
- The Witch's House, 1963
- Who's Been Sitting in My Chair?, 1963
- A Little Less Than Kind, 1964
- Run--If You Can, 1964 (short story)
- The Turret Room, 1965
- Dream of Fair Woman, 1966
- I See You, 1966 (short story collection)

- "At the Circus"
- "The World Turned Upside Down"
- "The Enemy"
- "Miss Murphy"
- "Motto Day"
- "The Weight of the Word"
- "The Conformers"
- "How They Met"
- "I See You"

- The Gift Shop, 1966
- Lemon in the Basket, 1967
- The Balloon Man, 1968
- Seven Seats to the Moon, 1969
- The Protege, 1970
- Night Call and Other Stories of Suspense, ed. Rick Cypert and Kirby McCauley, Crippen & Landru Publishers, 2014

- "Mink Coat, Very Cheap"
- "From Out of the Garden"
- "Protector of Travelers"
- "The Other Shoe"
- "A Matter of Timing"
- "The Splintered Monday"
- "The Case for Miss Peacock"
- "The Cool Ones"
- "Night Call"
- "More Than One Kind of Luck"
- "St. Patrick's Day in the Morning"
- "The Light Next Door"
- "The Vise"
- "The Second Commandment"
- "Man in the Road"

== Filmography ==
=== Screenplays ===
- "Incident at a Corner", episode of Startime, dir. Alfred Hitchcock, 1959
- "The Summer Hero," episode of The Chevy Mystery Show, 1960
- Three episodes of Alfred Hitchcock Presents: "Sybilla" (dir. Ida Lupino); "The Five-Forty-Eight" (adapted from the John Cheever short story); and "Across the Threshold", 1960
- The Mark of the Hand was adapted for an episode of the Thriller television series.

=== Film adaptations of Armstrong's novels and stories ===
- Merci pour le chocolat, 2000 (from the novel The Chocolate Cobweb) (dir. Claude Chabrol)
- The Sitter, 1991 (from the novel Mischief) (dir. Rick Berger)
- La Rupture, 1970 (from the novel The Balloon Man) (dir. Claude Chabrol)
- Talk About a Stranger, 1952 (from the short story, "The Enemy")
- Don't Bother to Knock, 1952 (from the novel Mischief) (dir. Roy Baker)
- The Three Weird Sisters, 1948 (from the novel The Case of the Weird Sisters) (dir. Daniel Birt)
- The Unsuspected, 1947 (dir. Michael Curtiz)
