= Any Number Can Play =

1949 film by Mervyn LeRoy

- Directed by: Mervyn LeRoy
- Screenplay by: Richard Brooks
- Based on: Any Number Can Play; 1945 novel by Edward Harris Heth
- Produced by: Arthur Freed
- Starring: Clark Gable; Alexis Smith; Wendell Corey; Audrey Totter; Frank Morgan; Mary Astor; Lewis Stone; Barry Sullivan; Edgar Buchanan
- Cinematography: Harold Rosson
- Edited by: Ralph E. Winters
- Music by: Lennie Hayton
- Production company: Metro-Goldwyn-Mayer
- Distributed by: Loew's Inc.
- Release dates: June 30, 1949 (New York); July 22, 1949 (Los Angeles)
- Running time: 112 minutes
- Country: United States
- Language: English
- Budget: $1.3 million
- Box office: $3.2 million

Any Number Can Play is a 1949 melodrama film starring Clark Gable, Alexis Smith, Wendell Corey and Audrey Totter. Directed by Mervyn LeRoy, it is based on Edward Harris Heth's novel of the same name.

== Plot ==
Wealthy casino owner Charley Enley Kyng is advised by his physician Dr. Palmer to slow down after being diagnosed with a serious heart problem. Charley has a wife, Lon, whom he does not see enough, and an estranged teenage son, Paul. He also supports Lon's live-in sister Alice Elcott and her weak and duplicitous husband Robbin, a dealer in the casino. Charley attempts to quit drinking and smoking and vows to spend more time with Lon and Paul.

Robbin cannot pay a $2,000 gambling debt that he owes to a gangster, who sends two goons, Lew "Angie" Debretti and Frank Sistina, to collect. Robbin provides loaded dice to let them win back the gangster's money at craps. A disgruntled couple claim they have lost their entire savings at the casino and seek the return of their money. However, as Charley runs a legal operation, he refuses to budge.

Ashamed of his father's line of work, Paul vents to his mother. Charley tries to take him on a fishing trip in the mountains but Paul refuses. Charley is depressed by the breakdown of his family life but still rejects the wiles of a former girlfriend, Ada, who seeks to rekindle their relationship. Paul is dragged into a brawl at his high-school prom because of his father's business and is arrested. Charley arranges to free him from jail, but Paul will not speak to him, and Paul heads to the casino with his mother.

Big-time gambler Jim Kurstyn is on a winning streak and is threatening to bankrupt the casino. Committed to fair dealing, Charley refuses to close the game and even lifts the house limit to permit Kurstyn to bet as much as he dares. Kurstyn repeatedly taunts Charley that he is going to break him, but Charley will not relent, earning Kurstyn's respect. However, a bad roll of the dice causes Kurstyn to lose everything. A group of thugs who had been planning to rob Kurstyn on his way home instead turn their attention to Charley, who challenges an armed gunman to either shoot him and take the money or leave. Paul stands next to his father, followed by others, including Sarah Calbern, a dowager who has long carried a torch for Charley. In the chaos, Charley swings at the armed goon and drops him. Paul leaps upon the other one and knocks him to the ground, pummeling him. The goons and Robbin are expelled from the club. Lon's love for her husband is restored, and Paul gains respect for his father.

Recognizing when he has had enough, Charley wagers his casino and everything in it against his staff. Paul, on behalf of the staff, draws a 9. Rather than show his card, Charley simply says "You beat me" and walks away. Outside, Lon reaches into Charley's pocket and pulls out a jack and hands it to Paul, who beams admiringly at Charley as the three walk away.

== Cast ==
- Clark Gable as Charley Enley Kyng
- Alexis Smith as Lon Kyng
- Wendell Corey as Robbin Elcott
- Audrey Totter as Alice Elcott
- Frank Morgan as Jim Kurstyn
- Mary Astor as Ada
- Lewis Stone as Ben Gavery Snelerr
- Barry Sullivan as Tycoon
- Marjorie Rambeau as Sarah Calbern
- Edgar Buchanan as Ed
- Leon Ames as Dr. Palmer
- Mickey Knox as Pete Senta
- Richard Rober as Lew "Angie" Debretti
- William Conrad as Frank Sistina
- Darryl Hickman as Paul Enley Kyng
- Caleb Peterson as Sleigh
- Dorothy Comingore as Mrs. Purcell
- Art Baker as Mr. Reardon
- Helen Lynd as Ellen

== Reception ==
In a contemporary review for The New York Times, critic A. H. Weiler called Any Number Can Play "a competently acted and interesting entertainment but no great revelation" and wrote: "Its thesis is as obvious as stage money. The story ... has a wealth of solid, naturalistic and humorous dialogue which is often wasted on tangential plots and somewhat obscure characters. But the central yarn ... builds slowly and clearly to an expected but amiable denouement."

Reviewer John L. Scott of the Los Angeles Times wrote that Any Number Can Play "appears to be Gable's most promising box office film since the war."

According to MGM records, the film earned $2,466,000 in the U.S. and Canada and $739,000 overseas, resulting in a net profit of $763,000.
