= Alias Nick Beal =

1949 film by John Farrow

- Directed by: John Farrow
- Screenplay by: Jonathan Latimer
- Story by: Mindret Lord
- Produced by: Endre Bohem
- Starring: Ray Milland; Audrey Totter; Thomas Mitchell
- Cinematography: Lionel Lindon
- Edited by: Eda Warren
- Music by: Franz Waxman
- Color process: Black and white
- Production company: Paramount Pictures
- Distributed by: Paramount Pictures
- Release date: March 4, 1949
- Running time: 93 minutes
- Country: United States
- Language: English

Alias Nick Beal is a 1949 American horror mystery film starring Ray Milland, Audrey Totter and Thomas Mitchell (although third-billed, Mitchell plays the leading role). Directed by John Farrow, it is a retelling of the Faust myth, and is also known as Dark Circle, Strange Temptation and Alias Nicky Beal.

== Plot ==
Joseph Foster is an honest district attorney who wants to clean up the criminal underworld, but cannot catch their leader, Frankie Faulkner, no matter how hard he tries. After a foiled attempt to obtain critical evidence to convict an underling of Faulkner's named Hanson, Foster is left reeling.

In exasperation at another frustrated attempt, he cries out that he would sell his soul to put Faulkner behind bars. At that moment he receives an invitation to meet with a devilishly smooth-talking stranger named Nick Beal at a seedy bar beside the docks. With Beal's sinister aid he gets evidence to convict Faulkner's cohort Hanson.

Foster is encouraged by a circle of powerful admirers to run for governor. He accepts, with Beal acting as a Mr. Fixit, despite the uneasiness of his wife Martha and his good friend Reverend Garfield. Foster begins his rise to power in the company of Donna Allen, a fallen woman who is sent by Nick to entice him. Foster gets elected but resigns, sickened by the compromises he has made at Beal's instigation, forfeiting his soul. As he is preparing to leave with Beal for the Island of Lost Souls, his wife and Garfield arrive. They are able to thwart Foster's promise to Beal to accompany him by folding the contact between Foster and Beal into a copy of the Bible, thereby placing it out of Beal's reach. Beal then disappears into the foggy darkness from whence he came.

== Cast ==
- Ray Milland as Nick Beal
- Audrey Totter as Donna Allen
- Thomas Mitchell as Joseph Foster
- George Macready as Reverend Thomas Garfield
- Fred Clark as Frankie Faulkner
- Geraldine Wall as Martha Foster
- Henry O'Neill as Judge Ben Hobson
- Darryl Hickman as Larry Price
- Nestor Paiva as Karl
- King Donovan as Peter Wolfe
- Charles Evans as Paul Norton
- Douglas Spencer as Henry T. Finch
- Ernö Verebes as Mr. Cox
- Arlene Jenkins as Aileen
- Pepito Pérez as poster man
- Joey Ray as Tommy Ray

== Reception ==
A 1949 review of the film in The New York Times held that, "Due to the fine acting and the wily direction, the story plays exceptionally well, but the script tends to be somewhat wobbly and indecisive upon reflection."

A contemporary review by Film4 contended "Milland is outstanding as the personification of evil—a talent often obscured by his charm and early juvenile good looks."

== Home media ==
The film was included in volume one of Viavision's "Essential Film Noir" series of Blu-rays released on October 28, 2020. Kino Lorber released a region A Blu-ray edition of the film through their Kino Lorber Studio Classics label on July 13, 2021.

== See also ==
- Deals with the Devil in popular culture, which includes a list of films
