= Lady in the Lake =

1947 film by Robert Montgomery

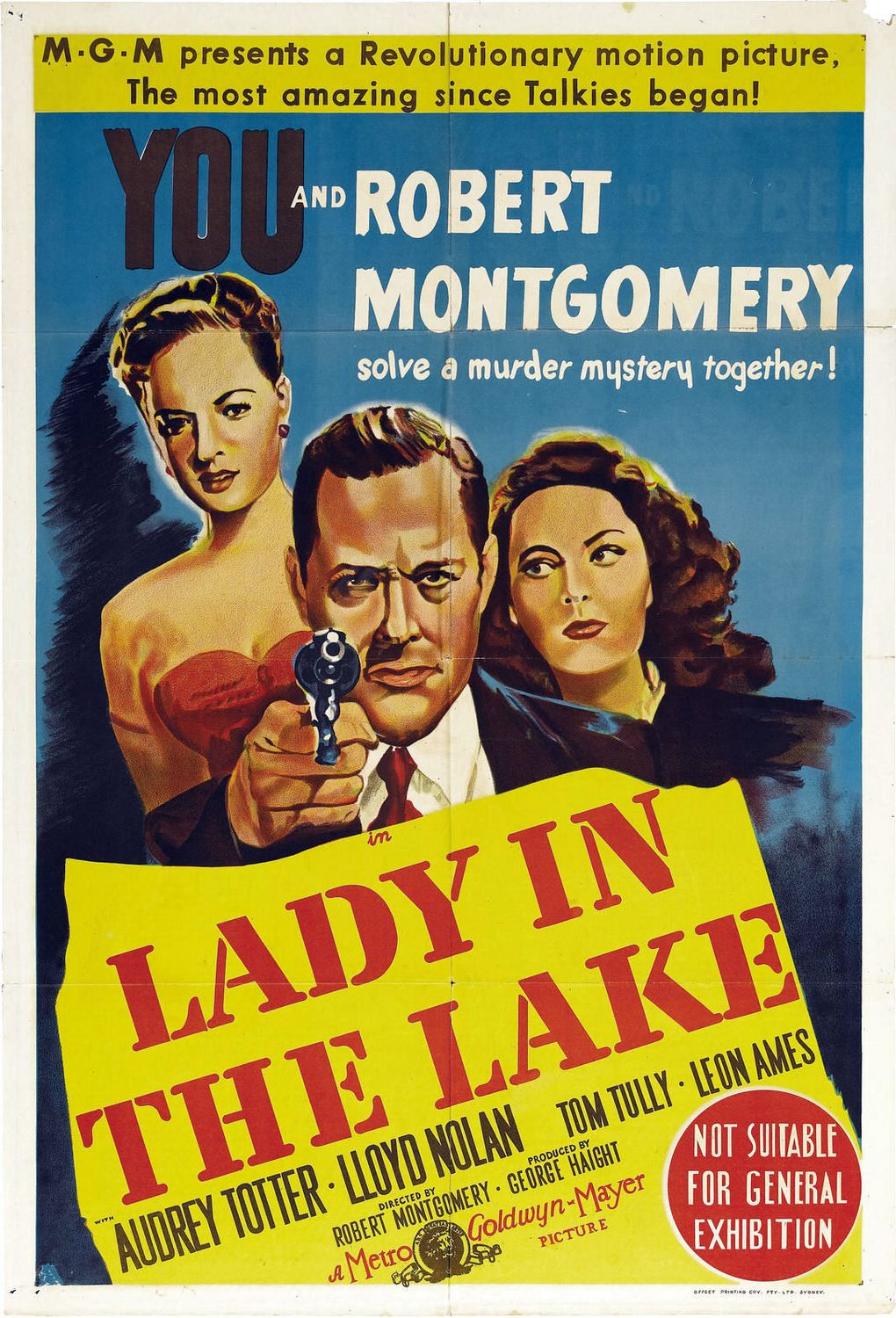
- Australian theatrical release poster
- Directed by: Robert Montgomery
- Screenplay by: Steve Fisher
- Based on: The Lady in the Lake; 1943 novel by Raymond Chandler
- Produced by: George Haight
- Starring: Robert Montgomery
- Narrated by: Robert Montgomery
- Cinematography: Paul C. Vogel
- Edited by: Gene Ruggiero
- Music by: David Snell
- Distributed by: Metro-Goldwyn-Mayer
- Release dates: December 20, 1946 (London); January 23, 1947 (United States)
- Running time: 105 minutes
- Country: United States
- Language: English
- Budget: $1,026,000
- Box office: $2,657,000

Lady in the Lake is a 1946 American film noir starring Robert Montgomery, Audrey Totter, Lloyd Nolan, Tom Tully, Leon Ames and Jayne Meadows. The film is an adaptation of the 1943 Raymond Chandler murder mystery The Lady in the Lake and represents Montgomery's directorial debut and final film for Metro-Goldwyn-Mayer (MGM) after 18 years with the studio. Montgomery's use of point-of-view cinematography was blamed for the end of his career at MGM.

As director, Montgomery's ambition was to create a cinematic version of the first-person narrative style of Chandler's Philip Marlowe novels. (Note: In the film, Marlowe's name is spelled "Phillip" – with two "L"s – in the opening credits as well as on his detective license.) Aside from mirror reflections and direct addresses to the audience, Marlowe is never seen. The balance of the film is shot from his point of view, seeing only what he sees. MGM promoted the film claiming that it was the first of its kind and the most revolutionary style of film since the introduction of the talkies. The film was also unusual for having virtually no instrumental soundtrack, instead employing a wordless vocal chorus.

The film did not use the 195-page screenplay adaptation that Chandler had written for MGM in 1945 but rather a 125-page version written by Steve Fisher. The script changes the novel's midsummer setting to December, frequently using cheery Christmas themes as an ironic counterpoint to grim aspects of the story. The opening credits appear on a stack of Christmas cards, the last of which reveals a handgun.

== Plot ==
Trailer for Lady in the Lake

Tired of the low pay of his profession, hard-boiled Los Angeles private detective Phillip Marlowe submits a murder story to Kingsby Publications. He is invited to the publisher's offices to discuss his work, but soon realizes it is merely a ploy. A few days before Christmas, publishing executive Adrienne Fromsett hires him to locate Chrystal Kingsby, the wife of her boss, Derace Kingsby. One month earlier, Kingsby’s wife had sent her husband a telegram saying she was heading to Mexico to divorce him and marry a man named Chris Lavery. But, according to Fromsett, Lavery says he has not seen Chrystal for two months, and the telegram appears to be fake. It becomes obvious to Marlowe that Fromsett wants her boss for herself.

Marlowe goes to see Lavery, who claims to know nothing about any trip to Mexico. Lavery, however, says that Mrs. Kingsby was a beautiful woman before revising it to "is." He sucker-punches the detective, and Marlowe wakes up in jail. He is questioned by Captain Kane and a belligerent Lieutenant DeGarmot. Marlowe refuses to divulge anything, and Kane releases him.

Marlowe learns that a woman's body has been recovered from a lake on property which Kingsby owns, and that Kingsby's caretaker, Mr. Chess, was charged with the murder of his wife Muriel. Fromsett suspects that Chrystal is the real killer, as she and Muriel hated each other. Little Fawn Lake was also where Chrystal was last seen. Marlowe learns that Muriel was an alias for a woman named Mildred Havelend and that she was hiding from a tough cop, whose description fits DeGarmot.

Marlowe goes to see Lavery again. Inside the unlocked house, he encounters Lavery's landlady, Mrs. Fallbrook, holding a gun she claims to have just found. Upstairs, he finds Lavery dead, shot several times. He also finds a handkerchief with the monogram "A F".

Before calling the police, Marlowe goes to the publishing house to confront Fromsett, interrupting a Christmas party. In private, she denies killing Lavery. Kingsby, learning that Fromsett had hired Marlowe to find Chrystal, tells her theirs will be strictly a business relationship from now on. A furious Fromsett fires the private eye, but Kingsby immediately hires him to find his wife.

Marlowe informs the police of Lavery's death. At the scene, he suggests that Muriel was hiding from DeGarmot. DeGarmot slaps Marlowe, and the two men scuffle. Kane takes Marlowe into custody, releasing him only out of Christmas spirit.

Marlowe obtains more information on Muriel from a newspaper contact. She had been a suspect in the suspicious death of her previous employer's wife. The investigating detective, DeGarmot, ruled that death a suicide; the victim's parents strongly disagreed. Marlowe finds the parents have been intimidated into silence. His car is then run off the road by DeGarmot. Regaining consciousness after the crash, Marlowe gets to a pay phone and calls Fromsett for help. She takes him to her apartment, where she claims that she has fallen in love with him. They spend Christmas Day together while he recovers from his injuries.

Kingsby receives a phone call from his wife, asking for money and, unable to find Marlowe, goes to Fromsett's apartment to ask her if she has seen the detective. Marlowe agrees to give Kingsby's money to Chrystal, as Kingsby is being followed by police detectives. Placing his trust in Fromsett, Marlowe instructs her to have the police trail him, following a trail of rice he will leave.

The woman Marlowe meets turns out to be Mildred Havelend, alias the "landlord" Mrs. Fallbrook, alias Muriel. She killed Chrystal – the "lady in the lake" of the title – in addition to her former employer's wife and Lavery. DeGarmot was in love with Havelend and helped her cover up the first murder. Then she fled from him and married Chess.

Havelend pulls a gun on Marlowe in her apartment. DeGarmot tracks them down, having overheard Fromsett speaking to Captain Kane and following Marlowe's trail of rice. He plans to kill them both with Havelend's gun and stage it to look as if she and Marlowe shot each other. DeGarmot then shoots a pleading Mildred several times. Kane arrives just in time to gun down his own crooked cop, saving Marlowe.

== Cast ==
- Robert Montgomery as Phillip Marlowe ("Phillip" spelled with two "l"s, rather than with one)
- Audrey Totter as Adrienne Fromsett
- Lloyd Nolan as Lt. DeGarmot
- Tom Tully as Capt. Kane
- Leon Ames as Derace Kingsby
- Jayne Meadows as Muriel, aka Mildred Havelend, aka Mrs. Fallbrook
- Dick Simmons as Chris Lavery
- Morris Ankrum as Eugene Grayson
- Lila Leeds as Receptionist
- William Roberts as Artist
- Kathleen Lockhart as Mrs. Grayson

The "actress" credited as playing Chrystal Kingsby, "Ellay Mort", is an inside joke, as the character is never seen in the film. The name is a homonym of the French "elle est morte," meaning "she is dead".

== Production ==
Montgomery had acted as director for John Ford on They Were Expendable when Ford became ill, and he wanted to direct again. He convinced MGM to buy the rights to Chandler's latest novel, The Lady in the Lake, for which the studio paid a reported $35,000. As Chandler had received Academy Award nominations for the scripts for Double Indemnity and The Blue Dahlia, Montgomery recruited him to write the screenplay for his own novel. After receiving Chandler's resulting 195-page screenplay, which has been called "remarkably bad", Montgomery hired Steve Fisher to completely rewrite it. (Chandler and Fisher had both been writers for Black Mask magazine in the 1930s.) Fisher contributed major changes such as shifting the time of the film to the Christmas holiday season and dropping all of the scenes at the lake. Chandler objected to these changes and was insulted that another writer was changing his story, but he still insisted on a screenplay credit. However, when he saw the final result, Chandler demanded that his name be removed from the film.

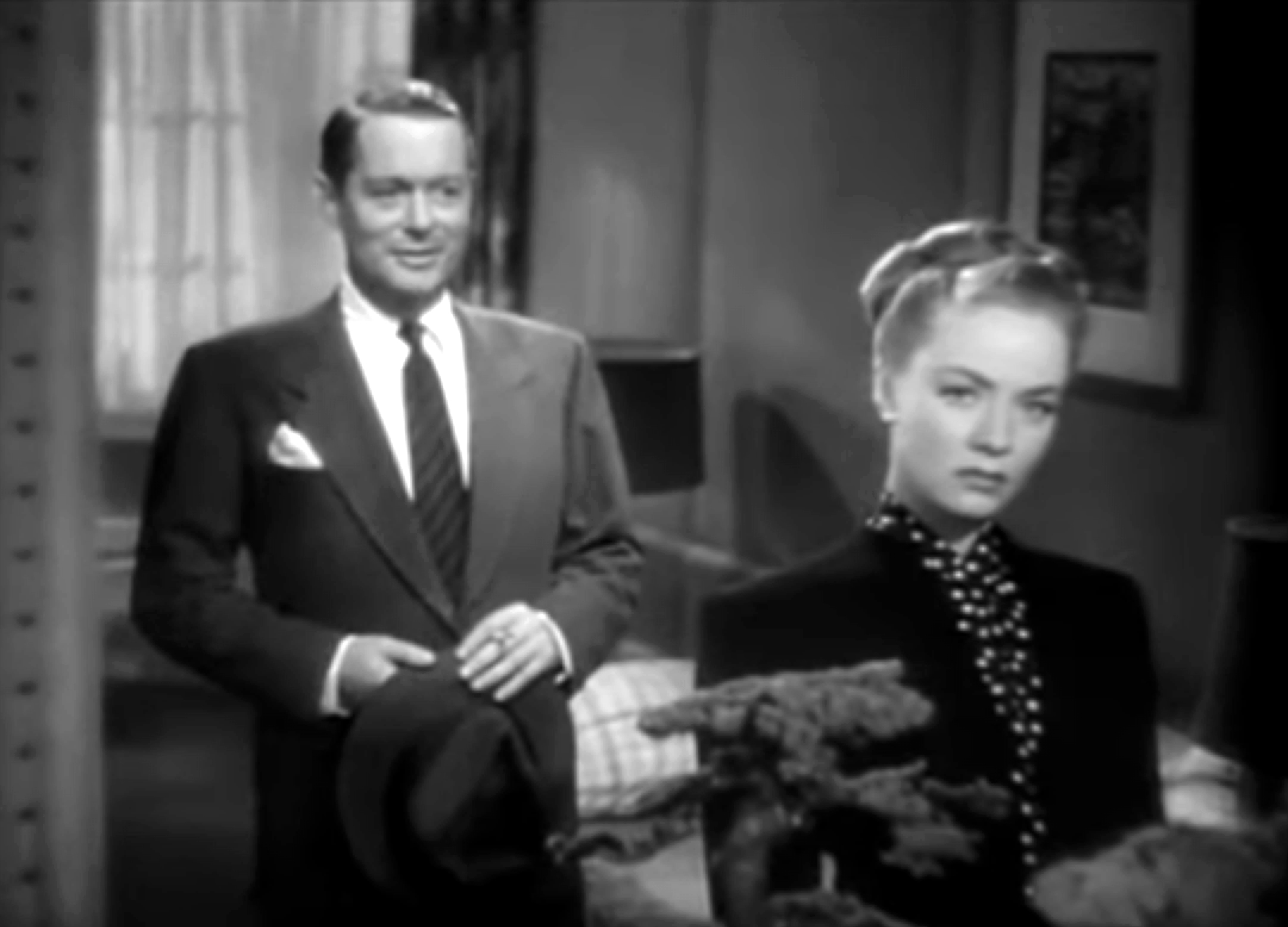
Robert Montgomery and Audrey Totter, reflected in a mirror in Lady in the Lake

Montgomery tried a technique that had often been discussed in Hollywood but never used in a major film, in which the camera represents the point of view of the protagonist, while other characters talk directly to the camera. The voice of Marlowe is that of Montgomery, but his face is shown only in reflections. MGM objected to Montgomery's first-person idea, as it meant that he would only be seen infrequently, so the studio insisted that Montgomery film an explanatory prologue in which Marlowe speaks directly to the camera. The studio produced the film with great secrecy to protect the innovation from those who may have laid claim to it. Montgomery later remarked: "I had a little trouble making that picture. That is, if you call eight years of arguing trouble. Nobody seems to want an actor to become a director. And the idea for this film wasn't exactly a pushover to sell."

Various techniques were devised to enhance the realism of the subjective camera. For example, in order to simulate the protagonist walking, MGM photography head John Arnold developed a modified camera dolly with four independent wheels, allowing it to walk through doors and up stairs. A seat was attached to the front of the dolly in which Montgomery could sit so that the actors could see and play against him while filming. For the fight scenes, cinematographer Paul C. Vogel employed a modified Eyemo camera with a flexible shoulder harness.

== Box office ==
According to MGM records, the film earned $1,812,000 in the U.S. and Canada and $845,000 elsewhere, resulting in a profit of $598,000.

== Reception ==
In a contemporary review for The New York Times, critic Thomas M. Pryor called Lady in the Lake "a fresh and interesting perspective on a murder mystery" and wrote:

In making the camera an active participant, rather than an off-side reporter, Mr. Montgomery has, however, failed to exploit the full possibility suggested by this unusual technique. For after a few minutes of seeing a hand reaching toward a door knob, or lighting a cigarette or lifting a glass, or a door moving toward you as though it might come right out of the screen the novelty begins to wear thin. Still, Mr. Montgomery has hit upon a manner for using the camera which most likely will lead to more arresting pictorial effects in the future. ... Mr. Montgomery has the least acting to do but his scenes are played with ease and conviction.

Also writing for The New York Times, critic Bosley Crowther analyzed Montgomery's technique:

[I]t appears that Mr. Montgomery has chosen the wrong story for his subjective job. For one thing, the principal character has to talk too much in this film. Indeed, he does most of the talking, which is wrong in this technique. To be entirely "subjective," the camera character should not talk at all because that destroys the illusion of complete participation by the audience. What is said by this character—this unseen, off-stage voice—may not be at all what the people in the audience are thinking or what they would say. As a consequence the voice takes on a sort of third-person personality; it comes from another observer who is apparently standing right alongside of you. And then, too, this frequent conversation from the camera, as it were, requires that the other characters talk directly to the audience most of the time. ... [T]he attitude becomes a bit monotonous. It would be better if, generally, these characters could go about their business while the subjective camera observed. Actually, in every picture the camera regularly observes from the viewpoints of first one character, then another. Most films are thus subjective in part.

In the Los Angeles Times, reviewer Edwin Schallert called the film "very ingenious" and wrote:

Of course, apart from the technique, there is a very thick murder plot, but I don't think anyone will worry whether this is conventional and trite or not. The manner in which the plot is dealt with takes care of the story's inadequacies, and in a quaint sort of way there is much suspense. "The Lady in the Lake" [sic] may not be liked by all audiences, but it certainly deserves the plaudits for trying to get away from formula, and it is well played by the cast.

== Radio adaptation ==
Lux Radio Theater presented a 60-minute radio adaptation of the film on February 9, 1948 with Montgomery and Totter reprising their roles.
