= The Unsuspected =

1947 film by Michael Curtiz

- Theatrical release poster
- Directed by: Michael Curtiz
- Screenplay by: Ranald MacDougall; Bess Meredyth (adaptation)
- Based on: The Unsuspected; 1946 novel by Charlotte Armstrong
- Produced by: Charles Hoffman
- Starring: Joan Caulfield; Claude Rains; Audrey Totter; Constance Bennett; Hurd Hatfield; Michael North
- Cinematography: Woody Bredell
- Edited by: Fredrick Richards
- Music by: Franz Waxman
- Production company: Michael Curtiz Productions
- Distributed by: Warner Bros. Pictures
- Release dates: October 3, 1947 (NYC); October 11, 1947 (US)
- Running time: 103 minutes
- Country: United States
- Language: English
- Box office: $2 million (US/Canada rentals)

The Unsuspected is a 1947 American mystery film noir directed by Michael Curtiz and starring Claude Rains, Joan Caulfield, Audrey Totter, Constance Bennett, Hurd Hatfield, and Michael North. The film was based on the 1946 novel of the same title by Charlotte Armstrong. The screenplay was co-written by Bess Meredyth, who was married to director Curtiz.

== Plot ==
In the suburban New York home of Victor Grandison (Claude Rains), a shadowy figure murders his secretary, Roslyn Wright (Barbara Woodell). He leaves her body hanging from a chandelier, and the death is reported as a suicide.

A week later Victor is broadcasting an episode of his popular "true crime" radio show, "The Unsuspected". At his home, his niece Althea (Audrey Totter) is throwing a surprise birthday party for Victor. She hopes it will take his mind off the combined loss of his secretary and his wealthy ward, Matilda (Joan Caulfield), who reportedly perished in a sinking ship en route to Portugal weeks earlier. Oliver (Hurd Hatfield), Althea's husband, is drinking heavily. He and Matilda were engaged before Althea married him. Althea is shocked by the arrival of a mysterious stranger named Steven Howard (Michael North), who claims to have been married to Matilda.

After the broadcast Victor returns home from the studio and is underwhelmed by events there. Homicide Chief of Detectives Richard Donovan (Fred Clark) stays after the party to share a thick file on a hatchet-murder case with Victor and witnesses Victor's first meeting with Steven. With Matilda's multi-million-dollar estate to be settled, Victor asks Donovan to investigate. Meanwhile, in Rio de Janeiro, Matilda boards a Pan American plane.

Victor dictates a script to a phonograph record, which he uses to rehearse his shows. His producer, Jane Moynihan (Constance Bennett), asks what's wrong; he seems to have lost his zip. He responds that he has had a premonition. Donovan reports back that Steven checks out, and indeed is very rich. A cable arrives. Althea is making a play for Steven when Victor delivers the news that Matilda is alive and well, and arriving the next day.

Steven meets Matilda at the airport. He takes her to a bar, where he tells her they were married. She claims to have no memory of him or their marriage, despite a marriage certificate and a visit to the house of the judge who married them, where the judge recognizes her.

Back at Victor Grandison's house, Press (Jack Lambert), a killer whose identity Victor has uncovered but kept secret, threatens to kill him, but is thwarted when Victor plays a copy of the confession he recorded at the time. Victor threatens that the police will hear it if he is killed. Press then becomes Victor's henchman.

Steven and Matilda arrive at the Grandison house, where Matilda wishes to go around back, directly to her room, to avoid people. However, when she gets there, she finds Althea has taken over her room, because they thought she "wasn't coming back." After a short conversation where Matilda gets a look at Althea's true character, she has Althea leave so she can take a bath.

Steven and Victor discuss what to do about Matilda's amnesia surrounding her marriage, and Victor says he should stay in the guest house for the time being. Then Steven runs into Jane Moynihan; they walk into the bar to find Oliver sitting in the dark. Oliver complains about Althea and asks Steven to be meaner to her to thwart her attraction to him.

Meanwhile, Victor visits Matilda in her bedroom to welcome her back. They discuss Oliver, Matilda's marriage, and her amnesia. Victor is certain that Steven is not really Matilda's husband, but he believes that they should play along with him until they know what he wants.

The next day, Steven takes the early train to town; Victor searches and finds a picture of Roslyn in Steven's wallet. In the city, Jane meets Steven. They have been working together to prove that Roslyn was murdered. Steven goes to Donovan and gives him new evidence, which Donovan later shows to Victor, indicating that Roslyn's death was a murder, that she received a phone call shortly before her death, and that someone hung up the phone.

Althea, who had been on the phone with Roslyn at the time of the murder and concealed it from police, already suspects the extravagant Victor. She kept quiet because she, too, depends on Matilda's money.

Victor records a quarrel between Althea and Oliver and kindly encourages Oliver to leave. He confesses to Althea that he killed Roslyn because she had discovered his misuse of Matilda's estate. Then he shoots Althea dead. With Matilda and Steven as witnesses, Victor uses the recordings to frame Oliver and sets the police on him. The alcohol-impaired Oliver dies in a car crash when the brakes Victor had sabotaged fail.

Jane brings Steven and Matilda together. He explains that he had known Roslyn all his life, and expected to marry her, but for being called away to war. Matilda dismisses his warnings about Victor.

Victor prepares to kill Matilda, pretending to need her help writing down lines for his radio show. The dramatic lines, now written in longhand by her, are actually text that he can use as her suicide note. He summons Press. Steven finds the recording that Victor used to frame Oliver and calls Donovan to tell him, but hangs up when Victor opens the door after leaving a brief coded message. Victor destroys the record. Press knocks Steven out and stuffs him into a trunk, then careens away in his pickup to dispose of it.

Victor gives Matilda drugged wine. She regains consciousness, sees the note and the open bottle of pills Victor has strewn over it, but cannot make it past the door. Donovan and others arrive, thanks to the interrupted call from Steven, and revive her. They track Press to the yard of a trash incinerator where he has dumped the trunk, which is perilously close to being dumped into the fire pit. Donovan stops the incinerator employee just before the trunk is destroyed.

Victor introduces his broadcast as usual but is thrown off when Donovan enters the control booth and police surround the auditorium. Matilda and a badly bruised Steven are ushered into the audience. Victor confesses to the murders on air, ending with: "Would you like to know who The Unsuspected really is? It is I. I am The Unsuspected, your genial host, Victor Grandison. Good night."

== Cast ==
- Joan Caulfield as Matilda Frazier, Grandison's ward
- Claude Rains as Victor Grandison
- Audrey Totter as Althea Keane, Grandison's niece
- Constance Bennett as Jane Moynihan
- Hurd Hatfield as Oliver Keane
- Michael North as Steven Howard
- Fred Clark as Police Detective Richard Donovan
- Harry Lewis as Max
- Jack Lambert as Press
- Nana Bryant as Mrs. White
- Walter Baldwin as Judge Maynard
- Ray Walker as Donovan's Assistant
- Barbara Woodell as Roslyn Wright (uncredited)

== Production ==
The Unsuspected was originally a serial in The Saturday Evening Post, running from August 11 to September 29, 1945. It was subsequently published as a novel in January 1946. Warner Bros. Pictures purchased the film rights prior to publication, and in May 1946, they announced that Michael Curtiz would direct. Ranald MacDougall wrote the first screenplay. By then, Warner Bros had just signed a 14-picture contract with Michael Curtiz's production company, and The Unsuspected was the first of three movies under the new arrangement. Curtiz's wife, Bess Meredyth, who was on the board of the company, was brought in to collaborate on the script. Charles Hoffman was assigned the job of producer.

The Unsuspected was in production from mid-January to mid-March 1947.

=== Casting ===
In September 1945, Robert Alda was reported to be the film's star. In October 1946, it was reported that Humphrey Bogart was being "pencilled in to head the cast". A column that appeared on October 23, 1946, noted that Claude Rains was being sought instead of Bogart, suggesting that Bogart was originally being considered for the role of the villain, although the items are too brief to be certain of this, and he may have been intended for the hero part.

Eventually, Dana Andrews was set to star as part of a package deal including Virginia Mayo and Cathy O'Donnell. All three were under contract to Sam Goldwyn, who was lending them to Curtiz for $150,000 plus 15% of the profits. Claude Rains reported to work on December 26, 1947. Two weeks later, Andrews left the production after being dissatisfied with the size of his part in comparison to Rains' in which Curtiz refused to make changes. Michael North was hired to replace Andrews. North was given an "introducing..." credit, although he had been appearing in films for years. This was because Curtiz changed North's given name to Michael, stating that his actual name, Ted North Jr., "appeared too much like a cowboy." Although the film's credits said "introducing Michael North", North had actually performed in the 1930s under the name of his father, "Ted North".

Curtiz had only agreed to take Mayo and O'Donnell in order to get Andrews, so his departure meant recasting their roles. On January 4, 1947, The New York Times announced that Joan Caulfield was being borrowed from Paramount to play Matilda, the role intended for Mayo. On January 15, 1947, The New York Times reported that Curtiz had signed Constance Bennett and Donald Crisp for "two major supporting roles". Crisp ultimately did not appear in the film. To fill the role intended for Cathy O'Donnell, Audrey Totter was borrowed from Metro-Goldwyn-Mayer. Eve Arden was named as playing a "leading role" in November 1946, but was not in the film.

== Reception ==
=== Critical response ===
The New York Times film critic Bosley Crowther wrote:

There is reasonable ground for suspicion that the people who made The Unsuspected thought that they were fashioning another Laura, popular mystery of a few years back... But, beyond a brisk flurry of excitement and wickedness at the start, it bears little showmanly resemblance to that previous top-drawer effort in this line... (T)he yarn gets away temptingly. Once launched, however, it starts leaking, pulling apart at the seams, and generally foundering in a welter of obvious contrivances and clichés... Claude Rains is intriguing as the fashionable radio ghoul and Michael North, a new young actor, looks good as the lad who 'breaks' the case. However, the rest of the performers... are as patly artificial as the plot.

Film historians Alain Silver and Elizabeth Ward write that the film is impressive because of its emphasis on style: "Jack Lambert as the blackmailed killer lies in bed smoking. The radio is on and Victor Grandison is detailing the story of his particular crime. The only source of the illumination in this dingy hotel room comes from a partially obscured flashing neon sign. The letters that are visible through the window seem to echo the thoughts of the uncomfortable murderer as it keeps blinking 'KILL...KILL...KILL'."

In their book, Hollywood in the Forties, Charles Higham and Joel Greenberg describe that scene and the whole sequence leading up to it as "the quintessence of Forties fim noir: The camera moves out of a train window, across a narrow street filled with neon signs, and up to a room where a killer lies smoking, terrified in the dark, listening to the story of his crimes related by Victor Gradison on the radio."

Throughout the film:

The images have an unusually massive opulence: the huge house, with its tables covered in black mirrors, pyramids of glasses in the cocktail bar, and record library which plays a complex role in the action, is a triumph of the Warner's art department. A girl's poisoning is seen through the bubbles of a glass of champagne, as though she were drowning in alcohol. A chest containing a body that has to be got rid of is lifted high on a crane above a disposal-ground, watched desperately by the murder's accomplices.
