= FBI Girl =

1951 film by William A. Berke

- Theatrical release poster
- Directed by: William A. Berke
- Screenplay by: Dwight V. Babcock; Richard H. Landau
- Based on: Rupert Hughes
- Produced by: William A. Berke
- Starring: Cesar Romero; George Brent; Audrey Totter
- Narrated by: Cesar Romero
- Cinematography: Jack Greenhalgh
- Edited by: Philip Cahn
- Music by: Darrell Calker
- Production company: Jadger Productions
- Distributed by: Lippert Pictures
- Release date: November 4, 1951 (United States)
- Running time: 74 minutes
- Country: United States
- Language: English

FBI Girl is a 1951 American crime film noir about a female FBI employee who becomes involved in a government plot involving corruption and murder. The film was directed by William A. Berke and stars Cesar Romero, George Brent and Audrey Totter. It was produced and distributed by Lippert Pictures.

== Plot ==
Governor Grisby is politically ambitious, as are his ruthless right-hand man Blake and Chercourt, an influential lobbyist on their payroll. However, Grisby is actually a wanted murderer named John Williams.

Fearing that Williams' fingerprints on file with the FBI will someday be traced back to him, Blake coaxes petty crook Paul Craig to ask his sister Natalie, a clerk for the FBI, to steal the Williams file. She now knows too much, so Blake arranges for Natalie to be killed in a car crash. FBI agents Stedman and Donley investigate. Natalie's roommate is Shirley Wayne, another clerk for the FBI. Shirley tells them that when Natalie was visited by Paul at lunch, both looked extremely nervous.

Shirley's fiancé is revealed to be Chercourt. She is asked to assume an undercover identity and carry a handheld radio, as Blake and Chercourt are still trying to find the right file so that the fingerprints can be destroyed. Grisby surrenders when the FBI arrives, and Blake tries to flee on a speedboat but is shot.

== Cast ==
- Cesar Romero as Agent Glen Stedman
- George Brent as Agent Jeff Donley
- Audrey Totter as Shirley Wayne
- Tom Drake as Carl Chercourt
- Raymond Burr as Blake
- Raymond Greenleaf as Governor Owen Grisby
- Margia Dean as Natalie Craig
- Don Garner as Paul Craig
- Alexander Pope as George Denning
- Richard Monahan as Donald (billed as Richard Monohan)
- Tommy Noonan as Television Act (billed as Tom Noonan)
- Peter Marshall as Television Act (billed as Pete Marshall)
- Jan Kayne as Doris
- Joi Lansing as Susan Matthews
- Walter Coy as Priest
- Byron Foulger as Morgue Attendant
- Joel Marston as Alex Nicholson
- Marie Blake as Landlady
- Fenton Earnshaw as Rand
- O.Z. Whitehead as Chauncey

== Reception ==
In a contemporary review for the Los Angeles Times, critic John L. Scott wrote: "It is somewhat of a lightweight to carry the load ... though interesting in some fresh plot angles. ... There are some situations in the film that are hard to believe, though they are fashioned expertly. The finish 'chase' generates some excitement."
