= Nova Pilbeam =

British actress (1919–2015)

- Born: Nova Margery Pilbeam; 15 November 1919; Wimbledon, England
- Died: 17 July 2015 (aged 95); London, England
- Occupation: Actress
- Spouse(s): Pen Tennyson (m. 1939–1941); Alexander Whyte (m. 1950–1972)
- Children: 1

Nova Margery Pilbeam (15 November 1919 – 17 July 2015) was an English film and stage actress. She played leading roles in two Alfred Hitchcock films of the 1930s, and made her last film in 1948.

== Early life ==
Pilbeam was born in Wimbledon, Surrey (now part of the London Borough of Merton). Her parents were Arnold Pilbeam, an actor and theatre manager, and Margery Stopher Pilbeam.

Time magazine reported that the actress, whose first name was an homage to her maternal grandmother from Nova Scotia, opted to keep her birth name, which she considered far less ridiculous than "Myrna Loy" or "Greta Garbo".

== Career ==
Pilbeam gained attention as a child stage actress. This led to much work in her teen years. She appeared in Alfred Hitchcock's film The Man Who Knew Too Much (1934), in which she plays a girl abducted by Peter Lorre's character, following this with her lead performance as Lady Jane Grey in Tudor Rose (1936). She had a starring role in Hitchcock's Young and Innocent (1937), which she regarded as "the sunniest film I was involved with", and formed a constructive professional relationship with Hitchcock.

She appeared in an early British television drama in 1939. That year David O. Selznick wanted Pilbeam for the lead in Hitchcock's Rebecca (1940), and thought she could be an international film star. However, her agent was worried about the length of a five-year contract; meanwhile, Hitchcock, whose outlook on the film was not the same as Selznick's, auditioned hundreds of others over many months, at last giving the role to Joan Fontaine.

Unlike some of her peers, Pilbeam never made a film in Hollywood, despite having made a month-long trip to America with Gaumont-British Studios head Michael Balcon and one of his lead actors, Jack Hulbert, in 1934. She continued acting, with appearances in at least nine British films, along with many stage roles, throughout the 1940s. One of her last films was The Three Weird Sisters (1948), its post-war Gothic-drama screenplay credited to five writers, among them Dylan Thomas. She remained working on stage for a short while longer, appearing at the Duchess Theatre in Toni Block's play Flowers for the Living in February 1950.

== Personal life ==
Pilbeam married Pen Tennyson, a great-grandson of the poet Alfred, Lord Tennyson and an assistant director to Hitchcock, in 1939. Tennyson became a film director the year they were married, but he died in a plane crash in 1941 while working as part of the Admiralty's instructional films unit. She was married to BBC Radio journalist Alexander Whyte from 1950 until his death in 1972. Their child Sarah Jane was born in 1952.

In her last years, Pilbeam lived in Dartmouth Park, north London. She died on 17 July 2015 in London, aged 95.

== Filmography ==
- Little Friend (1934) - Felicity Hughes
- The Man Who Knew Too Much (1934) - Betty Lawrence
- Tudor Rose (1936) - Lady Jane Grey
- Young and Innocent (1937) - Erica Burgoyne
- Prison Without Bars (1939) TV movie - Suzanne, Reformatory Inmate
- Cheer Boys Cheer (1939) - Margaret Greenleaf
- Pastor Hall (1940) - Christine Hall
- Spring Meeting (US: Three Wise Brides) (1941) - Baby Furze
- Banana Ridge (1942) - Cora Pound
- The Next of Kin (1942) - Beppie Leemans
- Yellow Canary (1943) - Betty Maitland
- This Man is Mine (1946) - Phoebe Ferguson
- Green Fingers (1947) - Alexandra Baxter
- The Three Weird Sisters (1948) - Claire Prentiss
- Counterblast (1948) - Tracy Hart
- The Shining Hour (1951) TV movie - Judy Linden
