= Voice acting in the United States =

Voice acting makes an important contribution to many films, television productions and advertisements in the United States. Voice acting is needed when making animated films; when the character represented does not appear visually in the action; when the actor playing the part is unable or unwilling to speak in it; or when a character breaks into song, with a singer's voice substituted.

Formerly, promotion of films did not usually feature their voice actors. However, since the prominently billed voice role of Robin Williams in the 1992 film Aladdin, films have frequently been marketed with well-known names as voice actors, billed as stars in their own right, and often receiving coaching by specialist voice actors.

In television and radio commercials and movie trailers, voice actors are often recruited through voice acting agencies.

== Broadcast media ==
For live action production, voice acting often involves reading the parts of computer programs, radio dispatchers, or characters who never appear on screen but are heard during a telephone call or recording or from an offscreen location. "Stunt double" voice actors are sometimes employed; if a voice actor loses their voice, someone who sounds similar can step in.

It is not unusual to find among the ranks of voice actors people who also act in live-action film or television, or on the stage. For those actors, voice acting has the advantage of offering acting work without having to bother with makeup, costuming, lighting, and so on. An occasional advantage is the fact that through voice acting, an actor can reprise a role that he has played in live action but would be otherwise too aged to portray.

=== Female voice actors in male roles ===
A common practice in animation and dubbing is to cast a woman to play the role of a young boy. Casting adult women for these parts can be especially useful if an ad campaign or a developed series is expected to run for several years, for while the vocal characteristics of a male child actor would change over time, the voice of an adult female will not. On the downside, a woman would require a higher wage than a child actor.

Notable exceptions to using women to voice young boy characters are the Peanuts animated specials and films, in which actual boys have traditionally been cast to voice the male characters, and sometimes even female characters (ex. Peppermint Patty). Pixar Animation Studios also casts boys instead of women to voice young male characters. As of 2018, all male roles in their full-length films have been played by male voice actors.

== Rise in use of film actors for voice roles ==
For much of the history of North American animation, voice actors had a low profile as performers, with Mel Blanc, the chief voice behind the Looney Tunes characters, as the major exception. Over time, many movie stars began voice acting in films. Aladdin was marketed with a noted emphasis on Robin Williams' role, against the actor's own wishes. The success of the film eventually spurred the idea of highlighting the voice actors as stars of a film, this becoming the norm in film marketing, with a greater focus on hiring Hollywood celebrities for name power, rather than performers with most experience in voice acting. This was most notable in the Toy Story (with Tom Hanks and Tim Allen) and Shrek film series (Mike Myers, Eddie Murphy and Cameron Diaz). Using anime voice actors as a box office draw was developed far earlier in Japan.

Voice actor Billy West on the problem with the use of celebrities in voice acting

Some voice actors, such as Billy West, are highly critical of using A-listers for voice roles in animated feature films. A particular point of contention is the practice of bringing on veteran voice actors (who are generally capable of greatly altering their voices and inflections in order to create personalities for characters) to read for a part, and then use the recording of the professional voice actor as a guide for the movie star, even though the actual character creation work is being done by the unpaid voice actor. West struck back at this practice in Comic Book: The Movie, in which the entire main cast comprises professional voice actors.

== Voice actors for commercials and local television ==
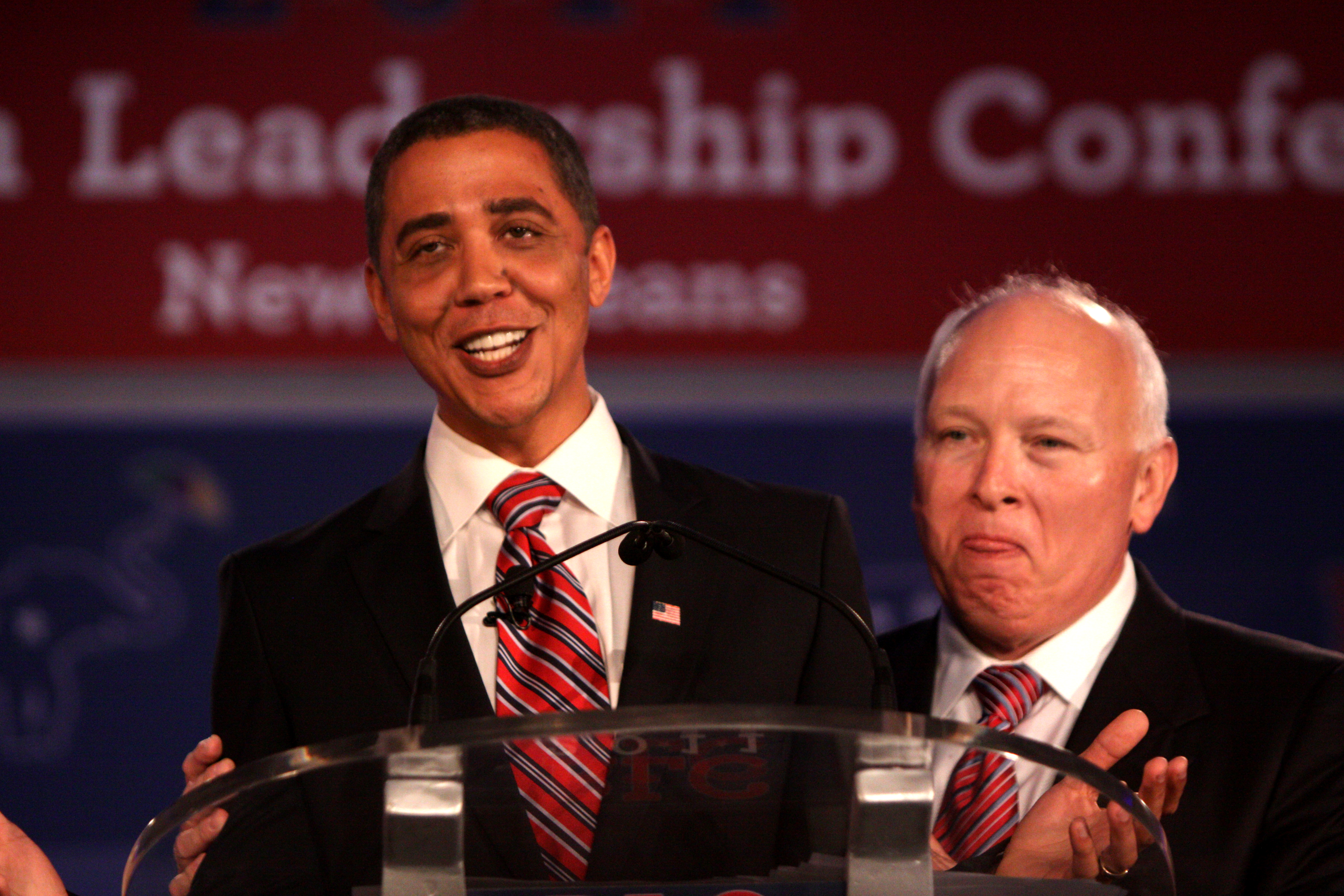
Reggie Brown, a voice actor and Barack Obama impersonator, while being escorted off stage

Voice actors have a relatively small but dedicated fan base, with appearances at large events like Comic-Con International, various anime conventions, and websites dedicated to profiling their work.

Commercials for television and radio are also cast using voice acting agencies.
