= Audrey Totter =

American actress (1917–2013)

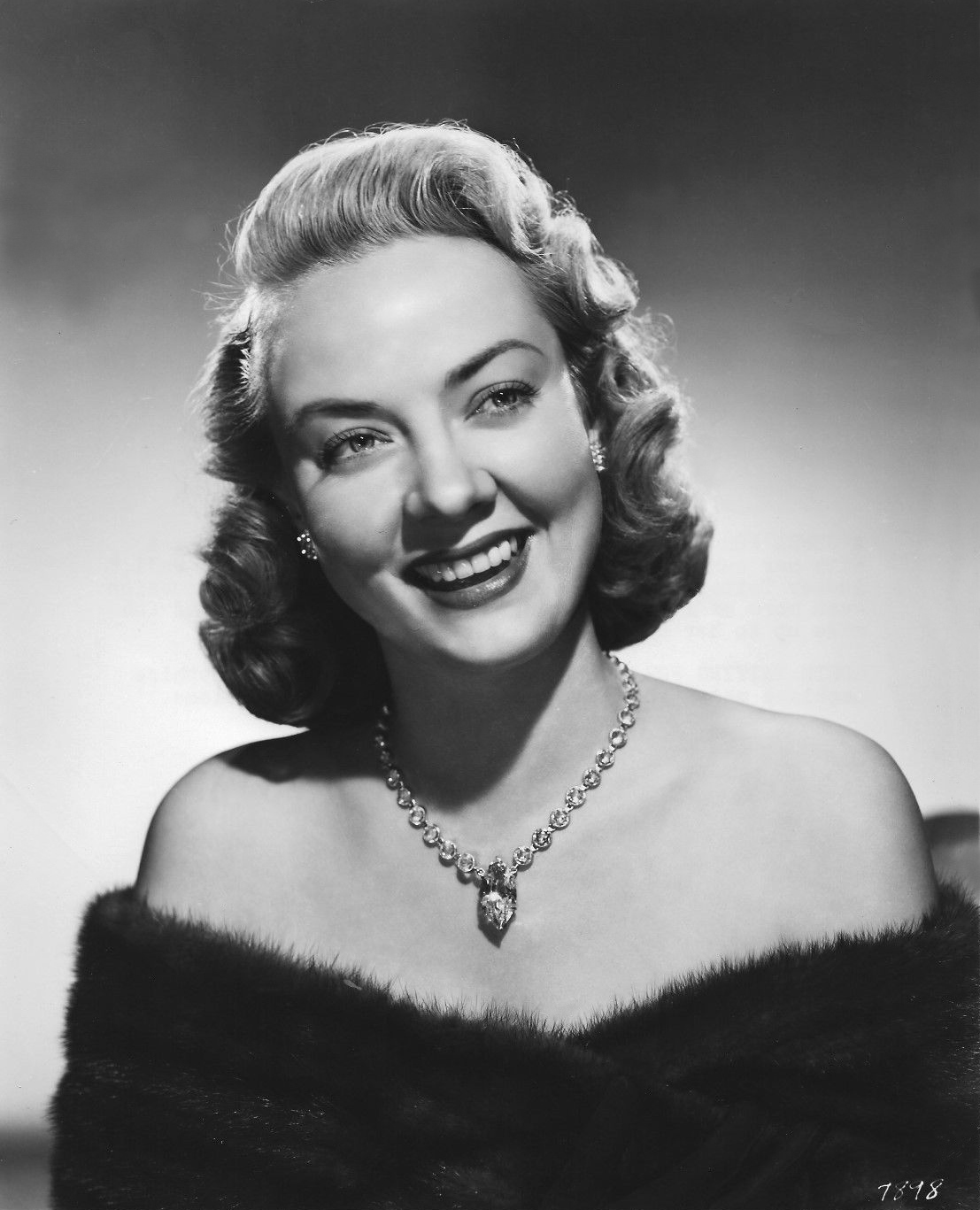
- Totter in the 1940s
- Born: Audrey Mary Totter; December 20, 1917; Joliet, Illinois, U.S.
- Died: December 12, 2013 (aged 95); West Hills, California, US
- Resting place: Pacific Ocean
- Occupation: Actress
- Years active: 1935–1987
- Known for: The Postman Always Rings Twice; Lady in the Lake; The Set-Up; Medical Center
- Political party: Republican
- Spouse: Leo Fred (m. 1953; died 1995)
- Children: 1

Audrey Mary Totter (December 20, 1917 – December 12, 2013) was an American radio, film, and television actor and Metro-Goldwyn-Mayer contract player in the 1940s.

== Early life ==
Audrey – some sources indicate "Audra" – Totter was born in 1917 and grew up in Joliet in Will County in northeastern Illinois. Her parents were John Totter, who was born in Slovenia with birth name Janez, and Ida Mae Totter. Her father was of Slovenian American descent and her mother was Swedish American. She had two brothers and a sister. Totter graduated from Joliet High School, where she acted in school plays.

== Career ==
=== Radio ===
Totter began her acting career in radio in the late 1930s in Chicago, only 40 miles northeast of Joliet. She played in soap operas, including Painted Dreams, Ma Perkins, and Bright Horizon. She created the role of Millie Bronson in the radio show Meet Millie, a situation comedy about a wisecracking Manhattan secretary from Brooklyn. The radio series began on CBS July 2, 1951, continuing until September 23, 1954. Totter dropped out when her film studio refused to allow her to appear as the character on television.

=== Film ===
Following success in Chicago and New York City, Totter was signed to a seven-year film contract with Metro-Goldwyn-Mayer (MGM). She made her film debut in Main Street After Dark (1945) and established herself as a popular female lead in the 1940s. Due to Totter's limited skill as a singer, MGM used Harriet Lee as her voice double in the 1945 film Dangerous Partners. Although she performed in various film genres, she became most widely known to movie audiences for her work in film noir. Looking back, Totter stated in August 1999, "The bad girls were so much fun to play. I wouldn't have wanted to play the Coleen Gray good-girl parts."

Among her successes were:

- The Postman Always Rings Twice (1946) with John Garfield and Lana Turner
- Lady in the Lake (1947) with Robert Montgomery and Jayne Meadows
- The Unsuspected (1947 for Warner Bros.) with Claude Rains
- High Wall (1947) with Robert Taylor
- The Saxon Charm (1948) with Robert Montgomery, Susan Hayward, and John Payne
- Alias Nick Beal (1949) with Ray Milland
- The Set-Up (1949) with Robert Ryan
- Any Number Can Play (1949) with Clark Gable and Alexis Smith
- Tension (1950) with Richard Basehart
- The Blue Veil (1951) with Jane Wyman
- FBI Girl (1951) with Cesar Romero and George Brent
- The Sellout (1952) with Walter Pidgeon, John Hodiak, and Paula Raymond

By the early 1950s, the tough-talking "dames" she was best known for portraying were no longer fashionable, and as MGM began streamlining its roster of contract players and worked towards creating more family-themed films, Totter was released from her contract. She reportedly was dissatisfied with her MGM career and agreed to appear in Any Number Can Play only after Clark Gable intervened. After leaving MGM, she worked for Columbia Pictures and 20th Century Fox, but the quality of her films dropped, and by the late 1950s, her film career was in decline, though she continued to work steadily for television.

=== Television ===
In 1954, Totter appeared in the pilot episode of the later 1957–58 detective series Meet McGraw (with Frank Lovejoy), and in 1955, she appeared in an episode of Science Fiction Theatre entitled "Spider, Inc." She appeared with Joseph Cotten and William Hopper in the 1957 episode "The Case of the Jealous Bomber" of NBC's anthology series The Joseph Cotten Show. In 1957, she was cast as Dr. Louise Kendall, in the episode "Strange Quarantine" of the NBC Western series The Californians.

Later in 1958, Totter played boarding house owner Beth Purcell in another NBC Western series, Cimarron City. The episodes were supposed to rotate among star George Montgomery as the mayor, John Smith as blacksmith/deputy sheriff Lane Temple, and Totter, but when the writers failed to feature her character, she left the series.

In 1960, she was in an episode of Alfred Hitchcock Presents, "Madame Mystery". From 1962 to 1963, she starred as homemaker Alice MacRoberts in the ABC situation comedy Our Man Higgins, with Stanley Holloway, Frank Maxwell, and Ricky Kelman. In 1964, she made a guest appearance on CBS's Perry Mason as defendant Reba Burgess in the title role of "The Case of the Reckless Rockhound".

Totter had a continuing role from 1972 to 1976, playing Nurse Wilcox, the efficient head nurse, in the CBS television series Medical Center, with James Daly and Chad Everett. Her last acting role was as a nun, Sister Paul, in the 1987 episode "Old Habits Die Hard" of CBS's Murder, She Wrote, with Angela Lansbury.

== Personal life and death ==
Totter was married to Leo Fred, assistant dean of the UCLA School of Medicine, from 1953 until his death in 1995. The couple had one child, a daughter.

Totter died on December 12, 2013, of a stroke, aged 95. After a memorial service, her body was cremated and her ashes scattered in the Pacific Ocean.

Totter was a practicing Methodist. She later noted that her earliest experiences in acting began during her youth when she performed in various holiday pageants and theatrical productions hosted by her local Methodist church in Joliet, Illinois.

During her career and subsequent retirement, Totter was a staunch conservative Republican, heavily committing her time to local party infrastructure through groups like the Hollywood Republican Committee, the Bel-Air Republican Women's Club, and the anti-communist Motion Picture Alliance for the Preservation of American Ideals. Later reflecting on her lifelong devotion to the party, she noted that she consistently voted for the Republican presidential line throughout the decades, casting votes for Thomas E. Dewey, Dwight D. Eisenhower, Barry Goldwater, Richard Nixon, Gerald Ford, Ronald Reagan, George H. W. Bush, and George W. Bush.

== See also ==
- Pin-ups of Yank, the Army Weekly
