= Alfred Hitchcock Presents season 5 =

Alfred Hitchcock Presents aired 38 episodes during its fifth season from 1959 to 1960.

No. overall	No. in season	Title	Directed by	Written by	Stars	Original release date
154	1	"Arthur"	Alfred Hitchcock	Story by : Arthur Williams; Teleplay by : James Cavanagh	Laurence Harvey as Arthur Williams, Hazel Court as Helen Braithwaite, Patrick Macnee as Sergeant John Theron	September 27, 1959
New Zealand chicken farmer Arthur Williams (Harvey) narrates his personal tale of murder, both of chickens and of his ex-fiancée Helen (Court). Helen desires to see the world, whereas Arthur wants to stay close to his chicken farm. Helen once saw the farm as a haven but later came to see it as suffocating. She leaves Arthur to marry a wealthy gambler named Stanley Braithwaite. Arthur had just happily showed off his modern farm and "perfect life" to friend Police Sergeant John Theron (Macnee) before Helen returns that very day after a year's absence. In her absence, Arthur had grown accustomed to his lifestyle (with no staff and no spouse) and desires no changes, so Arthur strangles Helen to death. Sergeant Theron and Inspector Ben Liebenberg (Douglas) investigate Arthur, while Constable Barry (Harvey) provides surveillance, but all are unable to find the body because Arthur has ground it up in his hammer mill into chicken feed. Supporting Cast: Robert Douglas as Inspector Ben Liebenberg, Barry Harvey as Constable Barry
155	2	"The Crystal Trench"	Alfred Hitchcock	Story by : A. E. W. Mason; Teleplay by : Stirling Silliphant	James Donald as Mark Cavendish, Patricia Owens as Stella Ballister	October 4, 1959
Austrian Alps. British mountaineer Mark Cavendish (Donald) narrates his story, beginning in September 1907 and ending forty years later on July 21, 1947. Upon arriving to the mountain hotel and speaking with the innkeeper (Astar), he witnesses friends Frederic Blauer (Dyrenforth) and Hans Barr (Holms) arguing with a man (Beregi, Jr.) about whether or not two men could have climbed the southern face of a dangerous mountain in horrendous weather, as the man claims to have seen them through a telescope. Mark takes the responsibility of telling the fallen mountaineer's wife, American Stella Ballister (Owens), of his likely death and immediately falls in love with her. Stella is devoted to her late husband Michael, who died on the mountain (by falling into a glacier), and she refuses to move on until she personally sees his body. Michael's partner, Mr. Ranks (Klemperer), blames himself while telling the story of his death, saying that they brought too little food (only three days-worth of provisions) for such inexperienced climbers. Mark attempts to romance Stella, visiting her home where she lived only with her servant (Anderson) even purchasing a ring and professing his love, but Stella rebuffs him. They visit Professor Kersley (Macnee) regarding the annual moving of glaciers and the likely time for Michael's body to reach the bottom of the glacier. After 40 years and on the prophesized day, a digger (Reichnow) discovers the corpse, but there is a locket on Michael's body with a picture of another woman, shattering Stella's long held belief that they had the perfect marriage. Supporting Cast: Werner Klemperer as Mr. Ranks, Patrick Macnee as Professor Kersley, Harold Dyrenforth (credited as Harald O. Dyrenforth) as Frederic Blauer, Frank Holms as Hans Barr, Ben Astar as Swiss Innkeeper, Otto Reichow as Digger, Eileen Anderson as Servant, Oscar Beregi, Jr. as Man Arguing at Telescope (uncredited)
156	3	"Appointment at Eleven"	Robert Stevens	Story by : Robert Turner; Teleplay by : Evan Hunter	Clint Kimbrough as David 'Davie' Logan, Norma Crane as the Blonde Lady in Bar, Clu Gulager as the Sailor, Sean McClory as the Irish Bar Patron	October 11, 1959
Seventeen-year-old David Logan (Kimbrough) wakes up from a nightmare and prepares to head out onto the town as his mother (Douglass) begs him to stay home. He spends a night on the town getting a shoeshine, drinking alcohol while underage, and talking to various sympathetic people: a blonde in a bar (Crane), a sailor (Gulager), and an Irish pub patron (McClory), all of whom are disconcerted by David's virulent hatred of his Irish piano-playing father from Dublin. He relates (to the blonde in the bar) coming home from school at the age of 12 to his perpetual cigar-smoking father being with a blonde-haired, blue-eyed woman. He then gets into a brief confrontation with the cigar-smoking sailor (Gulager) out of a group (Gering) before the two walk the town and share stories of those they hate, with David swearing that someone he hates will die that night. After leaving the sailor, David receives a shoeshine from a shoeshine boy (Pollard) on the street. Finally, he stops to drink in an Irish bar, where a patron (McClory) convinces the bartender, George (Sullivan), to look the other way, as he lacks a draft card. David acts crazily and runs into the piano player (Sully) while the bar patron tries to calm him. However, David's father, Johnny Logan, is a serial killer piano player who killed his blonde girlfriend for cheating on him, and his execution is that night at 11:00 PM. David finally smashes a television in despair as news is aired revealing his father's death, with other patrons (Rhodes, Kenyon, Kemp) forced to grab and calm him. Supporting Cast: Amy Douglass as Mrs. Logan, Joseph Sullivan as George the Bartender, Michael J. Pollard as Shoeshine Boy, Frank Sully as Piano Player, Richard 'Dick' Gering as Sailor, Jerry Rhoads as Cafe Patron, Taldo Kenyon as Cafe Patron, Kenner G. Kemp as Cafe Patron (uncredited)
157	4	"Coyote Moon"	Herschel Daugherty	Story by : Kenneth B. Perkins; Teleplay by : Harold Swanton	Macdonald Carey as the Professor, Collin Wilcox as Julie, Edgar Buchanan as Pops	October 18, 1959
While driving across the desert from Texas to California, an associate professor (Carey) arrives at a service station with a baby coyote found injured on the highway. The mechanic (Lambert) laughs that he would want a veterinarian for a coyote but agrees to seek help, to no avail; the coyote escapes anyway. The professor agrees to take on a hitchhiker Julie (Wilcox). However, Julie brings along her father, Pops (Buchanan) and her "brother" Harry (Lau), but he quickly notices that Pops has sold off his 2 good tires, taken his cigarettes, and continually told lies (such as Julie being pregnant and Harry working at Sentinel Mesa, which is revealed by a local waitress) (McVeagh). After attempting to leave the trio at an abandoned station, the three of them take the Professor's belongings and commandeer his vehicle. The Professor tricks them into abandoning him and his car by pretending it is out of gas and follows them (after they hitch another ride) to a Scorpion Springs gas station, where he calls the police and reports them. The Professor steals another passing car while the driver (Field) goes inside to talk with the station owner (Fresco) and picks them up, purposefully flooding the car's engine and pretending to be ill so they won't recognize him. An El Paso policeman (Henderson) arrives just in time to catch the trio in the stolen vehicle and arrest them. The professor then takes back his belongings and sneaks away unnoticed. Supporting Cast: Jack Lambert as Garage Mechanic, Wesley Lau as Harry, Eve McVeagh as Waitress, David Fresco as Gas Station Owner, James Field as Man with Car, Chuck Henderson as Policeman
158	5	"No Pain"	Norman Lloyd	Story by : Talmage Powell; Teleplay by : William Fay	Brian Keith as Dave Rainey, Joanna Moore as Cindy Rainey	October 25, 1959
Millionaire Dave Rainey (Keith) is paralyzed from the neck down and needs a respirator (iron lung) to breathe, as well as a full-time nurse (Lord) for care. He reminisces about his pre-paralytic life and being around boats, which he loves to watch. He accuses his wife Cindy (Moore) of having an affair with her new friend, Arnold (Wexler), and that they are planning to kill him; Cindy admits that they are both true. They discuss how they both suffer from his circumstances and Cindy explains that she couldn't divorce him because of appearances. That night, Arnold drowns Cindy in the ocean, because he is a contract killer hired by Dave. Dave can then have some enjoyment of his $6,000,000 fortune. Supporting Cast: Yale Wexler as Arnold Barrett, Dorothea Lord as Nurse Collins
159	6	"Anniversary Gift"	Norman Lloyd	Story by : John Collier; Teleplay by : Harold Swanton	Harry Morgan as Hermie Jenkins, Barbara Baxley as Myra Jenkins, Jackie Coogan as George Bay	November 1, 1959
Floridian Hermie Jenkins (Morgan) regrets marrying his naive animal-loving wife of fifteen years, Myra (Baxley), and admires the bachelor life of his widow neighbor George Bay (Coogan), who has spent the last 9 years fishing and drinking beer (since his wife's death from pneumonia in Kansas City). Even Myra's pet parrot insults him as a slob, and Myra only allows Hermie a small allowance of $10 per week and one beer. Only the local Mailman (Manson) defends Hermie as a man. Hermie talks Myra into adopting a snake from herpetologist Hansel Eidelpfeiffer (Pollard) that he says would otherwise be killed, even though Myra dislikes snakes. Hermie pretends to be a professor to deceivingly buy a coral snake for Myra for $10, in the hopes that it will bite and kill her. He gives her the snake as a 15-year anniversary gift, while he borrows a baseball bat from a child (McAdam) to kill the snake afterward. The snake, which is actually a harmless kingsnake, bites Hermie instead and he collapses, with the doctor (Field) afterward saying that he died of a heart attack. Myra decides to sell all the animals and go on vacations, which was what Hermie always desired. Supporting Cast: Michael J. Pollard as Hansel Eidelpfeiffer, Maurice Manson as Mailman, Steve McAdam as Boy with Bat, James Field as Doctor
160	7	"Dry Run"	John Brahm	Story by : Norman Struber; Teleplay by : Bill S. Ballinger	Walter Matthau as Moran, Robert Vaughn as Art, David White as Barberosa	November 8, 1959
Young gangster Art (Vaughn) is ordered by his new crime boss Barberosa (White), who enjoys teasing employee Prentiss (McVey) with his new pet piranha, to prove himself and earn a promotion by delivering $10,000 and then killing the recipient named Moran (Matthau). Art goes to the winery do the deed, but Moran holds Art at gunpoint in the cellar in order to get his money. With Moran now relaxed, the two men share a drink as Moran denigrates Barberosa's methods and lauds Art's guts and ambition. Moran suggests that Art kill Barberosa instead and offers money (initially $5000, but Art presses for $10,000) to help Moran take over the organization, with Art then serving as a "right-hand man". When Art agrees, Moran kills him; the counteroffer was a test set by Barberosa and Art's gun was empty. Supporting Cast: Tyler McVey as Prentiss
161	8	"The Blessington Method"	Herschel Daugherty	Story by : Stanley Ellin; Teleplay by : Halsted Welles	Henry Jones as John Treadwell, Dick York as J.J. Bunce	November 15, 1959
In the advanced future of July 1980, life expectancy has improved dramatically, with people regularly living to be 125 years old. J.J. Bunce (York) works for the Society for Experimental Gerology (the social problems arising from advanced age), which provides the discreet service of killing the healthy elderly (the Blessington Method, named after company founder Ralph Blessington) in return for a tax-deductible donation. He first kills a 93-year-old fisherman (Burns) by pushing him off a dock. He then visits Jersey resident John Treadwell (Jones), who works in an office so obsessed with health that the secretary (Edwards) doesn't even speak (rather she communicates through pre-recorded statements as to avoid catching a cold). Treadwell, a man in his 50s, agrees to have his tiresome and infirm 82-year-old mother-in-law (Patterson) "dealt with", as she is likely to live another thirty-plus years. She constantly enjoys causing a ruckus and making noise (which annoys his wife (Windust) of twenty-seven years and teenage children as well), saying that being quiet is for the grave. Bunce kills the old woman by pushing her wheelchair off a dock on a Sunday morning while the family attends church (as it is a law that all must attend church unless in possession of a health certificate, although John illegally goes fishing). Treadwell then realizes that it is only a matter of time before his own children, son Jack (Meadows) and daughter Jill (Kilgas), have him "dealt with" as well, as is implied by Bunce. Supporting Cast: Irene Windust as Mrs. Treadwell, Vaughn Meadows as Jack Treadwell, Nancy Kilgas as Jill Treadwell, Paul E. Burns as Fisherman, Elizabeth Patterson as Grandmother, Penny Edwards as Secretary
162	9	"Dead Weight"	Stuart Rosenberg	Story by : Herb Golden; Teleplay by : Jerry Sohl	Joseph Cotten as Courtney Nesbitt Masterson, Julie Adams as Peg Valence, Don Gordon as Rudy Stickney, the Thug	November 22, 1959
Advertising executive Courtney Nesbitt Masterson (Cotten) and his secret lover Peg (Adams) are held at gunpoint in Lover's Lane by a thug, Rudy Stickney (Gordon), who has nefarious intentions for Peg. When Peg flees, Courtney knocks Rudy to the ground, taking his gun and locking him in the trunk. Unwilling to go to the police, Courtney and Peg discuss what to do while driving around, with Peg bringing up the idea of killing Rudy. Courtney drops Peg off to protect her and kills the thug so that he will not reveal their affair. Courtney then goes to the police and gives a false story of picking up a hitchhiker and then having a struggle in which he kills in self-defense. Police Inspector Silva (de Corsia) informs Courtney of the thug's name and violent background after being brought the file by another plain-clothes police officer (Dockstader). When he goes to the office the next day, Courtney says hello to secretary Reita (Green) before his personal assistant Mary (Bonney) informs him that a detective is waiting in his office. Instead of a police detective, it is a private detective (Stroud) that has been hired by Courtney's wife (Greene) to follow him for the previous 5 days. This detective saw everything, drops the thug's recovered knife on the table, and states that it would be mutually profitable if they discussed the matter before he files his report with the wife or police. Supporting Cast: Ted de Corsia as Police Inspector Salva, Angela Greene as Mrs. Masterson, Claude Stroud as Lester Elleridge (the Private Detective), Gail Bonney as Mary (the Personal Assistant), Reita Green as Reita (the Secretary), George Dockstader as plainclothes police officer
163	10	"Special Delivery"	Norman Lloyd	Ray Bradbury	Steve Dunne as Bill Fortnam, Beatrice Straight as Cynthia Fortnam	November 29, 1959
Tom Fortnam (Lazer), like many boys all over the country, is excitedly buying mail-order mushrooms to grow in his home's cellar, and a delivery man (Hagerty) soon delivers them. Bill Fortnam (Dunne) discusses with his neighbor Roger (Maxwell) the concept of intuition and how people are starting to disappear. Bill and his wife Cynthia Fortnam (Straight) are worried when Roger mysteriously disappears after his son Joe (Burns) beginning to grow mushrooms, as well as warning them that something catastrophic is going to happen. Roger's wife Dorothy (Whitney) begs Bill to find Roger. Bill and Cynthia are then visited by a messenger (O'Neill) with a telegram (from Roger) urging them not to accept any special deliveries. Bill then gets a call from police, who says that Roger willfully and cheerfully was found taking a train to New Orleans. Bill posits an alien invasion by space spores that grow into mushrooms and possess human bodies after being eaten. This is confirmed when Tom acts strangely by ordering the lights to be kept off for the mushrooms and then demanding that Bill eat some of his mail-order mushrooms (which he then does, seemingly under mental manipulation by Tom). Supporting Cast: Frank Maxwell as Roger, Michael Burns as Joe, Peter Lazer as Tom Fortnam, Cece Whitney as Dorothy, Pat Hagerty as Delivery Man, Jim O'Neill as Messenger
164	11	"Road Hog"	Stuart Rosenberg	Story by : Harold Daniels; Teleplay by : Bill S. Ballinger	Raymond Massey as Sam Pine, Robert Emhardt as Ed Fratus, Richard Chamberlain as Clay Pine	December 6, 1959
Sam Pine (Massey) and his elder sons, Clay (Chamberlain) and Sam Jr. (Weston), rush to get his youngest son, Davey (Easton), to a doctor after being gored by a bull. They are deliberately blocked on the road by inconsiderate, selfish, uncaring salesman Ed Fratus (Emhardt), who had even previously smashed a child's (Hale) butterfly for the sheer joy of doing so. Fratus makes his living selling junk trinkets to people like local merchant Ben Tulip (Teal) and locals (Ates, Pollard). Fratus purposefully runs the Pine truck off the road and Davey dies as the truck gets stuck in the mud. A doctor (Wynn) even tells Sam that Davey would have lived if they had gotten him there in time. After getting information on the driver from Ben and waiting a month for the return of Fratus, Sam and his sons sabotage Fratus' automobile to run out of gas so that they can force Fratus to seek their help. Sam escorts Fratus to his home to fill up Fratus' gas tank. While waiting, Sam confronts Fratus with the death of his son and Fratus' culpability. Sam insinuates that he has poisoned Fratus and Fratus rushes to the doctor. However, one of Sam's sons performs exactly as Fratus had acted on the day of Davey's death by blocking the road, and in his panic Fratus crashes his car and dies. As revealed, the drink was indeed just liquor, not poison. Supporting Cast: Ray Teal as Ben Tulip, Brad Weston as Sam Pine Jr., Jack Easton, Jr. as Davey Pine, Roscoe Ates as Tavern Customer, Gordon Wynn as Doctor, Betsy Hale as Little Girl, Snub Pollard as Bar Patron (uncredited)
165	12	"Specialty of the House"	Robert Stevens	Story by : Stanley Ellin; Teleplay by : Victor Wolfson & Bernard C. Schoenfeld	Robert Morley as Mr. Laffler, Kenneth Haigh as Mr. Costain, Spivy as Spirro	December 13, 1959
Mr. Laffler (Morley) introduces his colleague Mr. Costain (Haigh) to Spirro's, an exclusive gentleman's club. He introduces him to various members, such as Lum Hung Fo (Komai) and Henlein (Wagenheim), but he is dismayed to discover that a member has resigned (leaving only 39 full members). The Specialty of the House is a rare but popular lamb dish, and all visitors must eat the same meal, as there are no menus. Laffler outlines the club's obsession with the lamb and states his determined intent to become a full member. The owner Spirro (Spivy), who also prepares the lamb, introduces herself, and invites Costain to attend anytime. Attendant Paul (Keymas) keeps order for Spirro, making sure that members act appropriately. Laffler is jealous and attempts to keep Costain from joining him, but Spirro invites him in. Laffler loses his jealousy after being told he is being inducted as the newest full member and turns over control of the office to Costain when he is sent on a business trip. Costain happily tells the secretary, Mrs. Inkel (Ackerman), that he will be occupying the head office. Laffler returns for another meal only to observe Paul being assaulted in the alleyway outside the entrance to the club. When Laffler is about to leave the country for a business trip, he is invited by Spirro into the kitchen to meet the chef (Turnbull). Afterward, Spirro tells the other members that the Specialty of the House will be served soon while smiling at the picture of Laffler, now hung with the other "absent" members. Supporting Cast: Madame Spivy as Spirro, Tetsu Komai as Lum Fong Ho, Bettye Ackerman as Mrs. Inkel, George Keymas as Paul, Charles Wagenheim as Henlein, Lee Turnbull as the Chef, Cyril Delevanti as Club Member (uncredited), Spec O'Donnell as Club Member (uncredited), Jack Chefe as Waiter (uncredited), Kenner G. Kemp as Club Member (uncredited), Joe Hinds as Club Member (uncredited), Carl M. Leviness as Club Member (uncredited), William Meader as Club Member (uncredited), Arthur Tovey as Club Member (uncredited), Robert Haines as Club Member (uncredited)
166	13	"An Occurrence at Owl Creek Bridge"	Robert Stevenson	Story by : Ambrose Bierce; Teleplay by : Harold Swanton	Ronald Howard as Peyton Farquhar, Juano Hernandez as Josh, James Coburn as Union Sergeant	December 20, 1959
1862, during the American Civil War. Recently widowed Confederate Peyton Farquhar (Howard) decides, after discussing current circumstances with his housekeeper slave Hattie (Goodwin) and friend Jeff (Tobey) (a Confederate Colonel), to blow up a bridge that the Yankees plan to use to cross, though he is warned beforehand by an apparent Confederate sergeant (Coburn) to leave things alone. The sergeant turns out to be a Union sergeant who follows and catches Peyton in the process of blowing up the bridge. Peyton is hanged by Union soldiers (Kennedy, Weston, Stewart), but the rope breaks and he seemingly escapes. With the help of his slave Josh (Hernandez), who perpetually sings despite Peyton's fearful mood, Peyton travels past various Union soldiers safely (but must strangle the Union sergeant who caught him) and returns home to his wife Melissa. Right before the two can embrace, however, it cuts to the rope finishing the hanging procedure. Peyton is dead and only imagined the whole escape. With the hanging complete, the sergeant orders the corporal to cut Peyton down. Supporting Cast: Kenneth Tobey as Confederate Colonel Jeff, Ruby Goodwin as Hattie, Douglas Kennedy as Union Officer, Brad Weston as Union Corporal, Gregg Stewart as Union Soldier
167	14	"Graduating Class"	Herschel Daugherty	Story by : Edouard Sandoz; Teleplay by : Stirling Silliphant	Wendy Hiller as Laura Siddons, Gigi Perreau as Gloria Barnes, Jocelyn Brando as Vice Principal Julia Conrad	December 27, 1959
Principal Dorothy (Bromley) meets with Vice Principal Julia Conrad (Brando) when Laura Siddons (Hiller), Dorothy's old friend, arrives to be a European literature instructor and homeroom counselor at a girl's college. Dorothy tells Julia about Siddons writing a letter to her out of desperation (from losing her remaining relatives) and surviving the war (World War II). Laura becomes quite fond of her brightest student, Gloria Barnes (Perreau), while being annoyed by perpetually late Vera Carson (Lloyd) and other students (Payne). While out with her extremely talkative neighbor Ben Prowdy (Harris) and searching for a collection of the works of Mary Shelley with a bookstore clerk (Soule), Siddons sees Barnes with a man outside of a nightclub. After dozing in class the next day, Barnes claims that she was up all night looking after her sick mother (Kennedy) while her father (McMahon) is away. Siddons sees the pair again the next night, a Friday, and assumes that they are having an affair, so she gets Prowdy to drive her around following them and then leaves a note under the man's apartment door. The next day, Barnes goes to Siddon's home to protest her intrusion, while Siddons defends her involvement as protecting a bright student. Barnes tells Siddons that she is actually secretly married to the man, whose father owns the nightclub at which they are seen, and she plans to tell her parents at the right time, and Siddons agrees to keep the secret. On Monday, however, Siddons gets an 'open note' in class from Barnes about Prowdy blackmailing Barnes' parents for $20,000, and her students walk out in protest. The blackmail caused her mother to collapse. Prowdy is arrested and accuses Siddons of masterminding the blackmail. Supporting Cast: Robert H. Harris as Ben Prowdy, Josie Lloyd as Vera Carson, Sheila Bromley as Dorothy the Principal, Madge Kennedy as Mrs. Barnes, David McMahon as Mr. Barnes, Julie Payne as Gloria's Friend Connie, Olan Soule as Bookstore Clerk (uncredited)
168	15	"Man from the South"	Norman Lloyd	Story by : Roald Dahl; Teleplay by : William Fay	Steve McQueen as the Gambler, Peter Lorre as Carlos, Neile Adams as the Woman	January 3, 1960
In Las Vegas, a bartender (Gordon) serves a broke gambler (McQueen) and a woman (Adams) when they are approached by Carlos (Lorre), who proposes a bet on whether Gambler's lighter can light up ten times in a row, which would be monitored by a referee (McVey). If Gambler wins, he gets Carlos' convertible; if Gambler loses, Carlos will cut off Gambler's small finger. They retreat to Carlos' room, where a bellhop (Cavell) collects the necessities for the bet (including a hammer, nails, twine, and a chopping knife from the kitchen). The lighter works seven times in a row when Carlos's wife (Squire) suddenly arrives from Los Angeles and interrupts the contest, revealing that Carlos is penniless. They formerly lived on Caribbean islands, where Carlos won forty-seven fingers and lost eleven cars, before they were forced to move. Carlos's entire fortune, including the car, belongs to his wife, who lost three fingers on her left hand to win it from him. As Gambler goes to light the woman's cigarette, the lighter fails to work. Supporting Cast: Tyler McVey as Referee, Katherine Squire as Carlos' Wife, Marc Cavell as Bellhop, Phil Gordon as Bartender In 1997, TV Guide ranked this episode #41 on its list of the 100 Greatest Episodes.
169	16	"The Ikon of Elijah"	Paul Almond	Story by : Avram Davidson; Teleplay by : Norah Perez & Victor Wolfson	Oskar Homolka as Carpius, Sam Jaffe as the Abbot	January 10, 1960
Cyprus. Antiques dealer Carpius (Homolka) and assistant Paul (Janti) discuss business while he presents an antique amber bead necklace to a disinterested and bored younger love interest, Malvira (De Metz). Major Parslow (Gould-Porter) and Mr. Chiringirian (Longman) visit wanting a special icon for purchase. Malvira details her desire to leave and says she would rather accept death (than stay) when Carpius threatens her. A monk, Brother Theodorus (Greene), arrives at the shop to sell an item and explains how there is a nearby splinter monastery with valuables, such as the Ikon of Elijah. Carpius visits the isolated mountain monastery in order to steal the valuable icon. He pretends to desire to pray at the icon by lying to the Abbot (Jaffe) and Brother Constantin (Richards). With a candleholder, Carpius kills the monk, Brother Damianos (Catania), who is guarding the icon when Carpius is caught stealing it during the monk's rest, and Carpius falsely claims it to be an accident. The Abbot forgives him but says that Carpius must stay with the icon for the rest of his life, praying for absolution. Supporting Cast: Danielle De Metz as Malvira, Arthur Gould-Porter (credited as A.E. Gould-Porter) as Major Parslow, Richard Longman as Mr. Chiringirian, David Janti as Paul the Assistant, Fred Catania as Brother Damianos, Robert Richards (credited as Robert P. Richards) as Brother Constantin, William E. Green (credited as William Greene) as Brother Theodorus
170	17	"The Cure"	Herschel Daugherty	Story by : Robert Bloch; Teleplay by : Michael Pertwee	Nehemiah Persoff as Jeff Jensen, Mark Richman as Mike, Cara Williams as Marie Jensen	January 24, 1960
At night deep in the jungle, when oil explorer Jeff Jensen (Persoff) is non-fatally attacked by his wife, Marie (Williams), he assumes that Marie is suffering from tropical fever that affects the brain. Native manservant Luiz (Strong) offers to stab and kill her, but Jeff says no. When he confronts Marie, she laughs instead of crying, so he requests servant Chita (Burton) to watch over her. Jeff arranges for his friend Mike (Richman), a fellow oilman, and Luiz to take Marie downriver to a shrink. Mike and Marie are having an affair and attempt to kill Luiz while resting at night on the journey; Luiz kills Mike and follows Jeff's orders to the letter by sending Marie to a native "head doctor" who shrinks her head. Supporting Cast: Leonard Strong as Luiz, Jhean Burton as Chita
171	18	"Backward, Turn Backward"	Stuart Rosenberg	Story by : Dorothy Salisbury Davis; Teleplay by : Charles Beaumont	Tom Tully as Phil Canby, Phyllis Love as Sue Thompson, Alan Baxter as Sheriff Andy Willetts	January 31, 1960
Phil Canby (Tully) is accused of murdering Matt Thompson during an argument over 59-year-old Canby's romantic relationship with Matt's 19-year-old daughter Sue (Love). Sheriff Andy Willetts (Baxter) and chemist Saul (Maxwell) discuss the likelihood of a fair trial while a local boy (Erickson) inquires about a hanging. The murder weapon is a wrench, and both the weapon and murder scene were cleaned immaculately with laundry soap. Sheriff Andy confronts supposed witness Mrs. Lyons (Converse), a neighbor who heard crying but who Sheriff Andy believes is jealous from Canby's refusal to propose marriage. Canby's alibi is that he was babysitting his calm grandson, but Lyons insists that she heard the grandson hysterically crying around the time of the murder. Canby's daughter Betty (Welles) adamantly defends him, and Sue's story is that she fled when an argument with her father started. Canby details to Sheriff Andy when he fell in love with Sue the previous Spring, as he finally saw her as a woman. Sheriff Andy and authority Mr. Harris (Bailey) argue over publicly releasing details of the case. After the town minister (Jackson) presides over the funeral, Betty argues with both Sheriff Andy and her father Canby, as husband John (Carlile) attempts to hold her back. When Canby is arrested, Sue has a manic fit and begins crying, revealing that she in fact is the one who killed her father. Supporting Cast: Raymond Bailey as Mr. Harris, Rebecca Welles as Betty Murray, Paul Maxwell as Saul, Peggy Converse as Mrs. Lyons, David Carlile as John Murray, Selmer Jackson as Minister, Mark Erickson as Boy in Tree
172	19	"Not the Running Type"	Arthur Hiller	Story by : Henry Slesar; Teleplay by : Jerry Sohl	Paul Hartman as Milton Potter, Robert Bray as Sergeant/Captain Ernest Fisher	February 7, 1960
The episode opens detailing modern policing techniques, with a focus on fingerprint matching. Captain Ellison (Freed) reports a notable suspect on a new case, that of Milton Potter (Hartman), and describes a past case involving the man. Mr. Newton (Whitehead) discusses with his boss, Vice President John B. Halverson (Holmes), about how Potter's books don't match. Sergeant Ernest Fisher (Bray) is called in to investigate at the firm and inquire about Potter's personal details, which are lacking due to his mild-mannered discretion. Potter steals $200,000 from his place of work and surrenders to Police Sergeant Carmody (Alper). Potter tells Fisher and Lieutenant Hogan (Ellis) about how he had to steal the money after planning the theft for so long, but he refuses to disclose where the money is hidden. After almost 13 years working the prison library as a model prisoner who read every book on traveling, Potter is released and returns the money to now Captain Fisher, ending his parole. However, Potter has earned $154,862.25 from investing the stolen money, and he uses the profits to travel the world in luxury aboard cruise ships, while making new friends (Manson). Supporting Cast: Murray Alper as Sergeant Ed Carmody, Wendell Holmes as John B. Halverson, Herb Ellis as Lieutenant Hogan, Bert Freed as Captain Harvey Ellison, O.Z. Whitehead as Mr. Newton, Maurice Manson as Ship Passenger, Claude Dauphin as Co-host
173	20	"The Day of the Bullet"	Norman Lloyd	Story by : Stanley Ellin; Teleplay by : Bill S. Ballinger	Barry Gordon as Ignace 'Iggy' Kovacs, Glenn Walken as Young Clete Vine	February 14, 1960
Brooklyn, around 1924-25 and 1959-60. Young best friends Iggy (Gordon) and Clete (Walken) get into trouble looking into a mobster's car by owner Mr. Rose (Patrick) and his associate Joe (Landers). Iggy dreams of having the best golf clubs in New York, as his father (Elliot) enjoys playing after driving a bus. Clete's father works at a bank and reads all the time, and he is moving in a couple of days. While searching for golf balls to pawn (at a golf course), they witness Mr. Rose and Joe beating up a frightened man (Fresco) regarding bootlegging. Iggy insists on reporting the incident to a police Desk Sergeant (Hoyt) and patrolman (Gilman), but he is heartbroken when the police refuse to take him seriously and his father is too frightened to stand up for him. Rose gives Iggy $10 to give him a taste of the life, and he offers work running errands. Iggy changes his allegiance from his father to Rose. Thirty-five years later, Iggy has become a mobster himself, and Clete (Craven) sees a newspaper article of his death by gunshot (which was shown at the outset and end of the episode). Supporting Cast: Harry Landers as Joe, Biff Elliot as Mr. Kovacs, Dennis Patrick as Mr. Rose, John Craven as Older Clete Vine, Sam Gilman as Policeman, Clegg Hoyt as Desk Sergeant, David Fresco as Assault Victim, Norman Lloyd as Narrator (voice only) (uncredited)
174	21	"Hitch Hike"	Paul Henreid	Story by : Ed Lacy; Teleplay by : Bernard C. Schoenfeld	John McIntire as Charles Underhill, Robert Morse as Len, Suzanne Pleshette as Anne Underhill	February 21, 1960
August 8, 1959. On a road trip to Allendale, councilman Charles Underhill (McIntire) scolds his niece Anne (Pleshette) for willingly riding with a car thief whom she hardly knows. When Underhill stops for cigarettes, an old lady backs into his car and drives away. Teenage hitchhiker Len (Morse) unsticks his car horn, so they agree to give him a ride towards San Francisco. Underhill learns that Len is a juvenile delinquent (pickpocket) from an 'honor farm' and initially kicks him out, but then he agrees to keep his word. On the way, Len outlines the difference in thinking of an 'insider' versus that of an 'outsider' and talks about his 'outsider' knife-handling friend who quotes Dylan Thomas. When they stop at a diner, the kids dance while Underhill attempts to use the proprietor's (Burns) phone to call the sheriff (Len interrupts him). Underhill eventually comes to believe that Len is going to hurt him (as Len defends Anne's right of choice regarding her future), so he speeds to get the attention of a police officer (Morgan). Underhill claims that Len threatened him with a knife, but Len is revealed to be unarmed, and Underhill receives a ticket instead (and is also threatened with 10 days in jail). Underhill is distressed at destroying his crime-free record, but Len pickpockets the officer's book, saving him. Underhill then invites Len to continue traveling with them. Supporting Cast: Paul E. Burns as Restaurant Proprietor, Read Morgan as Police Officer Interesting Note: Read Morgan (January 30) and Robert Morse (May 18) were both born in 1931, and both died the same day (April 20, 2022), with Morgan aged 91 and Morse aged 90, respectively. John McIntire died on Morgan's 60th birthday, January 30, 1991.
175	22	"Across the Threshold"	Arthur Hiller	Story by : L. B. Gordon; Teleplay by : Charlotte Armstrong	Patricia Collinge as Sofie Winter, George Grizzard as Hubert Winter, Barbara Baxley as Irma Coulette	February 28, 1960
Hubert (Grizzard) is annoyed that his mother Sofie (Collinge) controls all of his finances, as she says he is too like his father. He learns that his mother has kept his father's medicine and has been thinking of taking poison to join her late husband, Arthur. Hubert's girlfriend Irma (Baxley) is dismayed at being broke and wants to meet Hubert's mother. Arthur has Irma pretend to be a psychic medium and convince Sofie that Arthur is lonely and desires her presence. Sofie decides to take care of her outstanding financial issues and then drink the poison. Irma wants to meet Sofie beforehand, but Hubert convinces her that such action could ruin everything and bring about potential police involvement for fraud or murder. Hubert returns expecting Sofie to take the poison alone, but she secretly poisons his drink as well. With a crisis of conscience, Irma calls the police to intervene, but Hubert had already drunk the poison, leaving Sofie alone to face the police.
176	23	"Craig's Will"	Gene Reynolds	Story by : Valerie Dyke; Teleplay by : Burt Styler & Albert E. Lewin	Dick Van Dyke as Thomas Craig, Stella Stevens as Judy, Paul Stewart as Vincent Noonan	March 6, 1960
Wealth seeker Judy (Stevens) narrates her desire to be rich, and she sees her path to that goal by marrying the heir to the Craig family fortune. Thomas Craig (Van Dyke) is disappointed when the estate attorney (Holland) says that his late uncle, Wilbur Orville Craig, leaves his fortune to his two-year-old dog Casper (Red), although Craig did leave $10,000 plus corporate shares to his housekeeper (Sessions). Thomas was left only $1, with free room and board in the mansion, but stands to inherit everything after the dog dies. Loyal butler Sam Loomis (Tyler), rather than Thomas, is chosen to shepherd the wealth for Casper. Thomas' girlfriend Judy tries to have Casper killed but fails repeatedly. Thomas tries to shoot Casper in a "hunting accident" but is interrupted by a vision-deficient hunter (Manson) and Casper's adorable nature. Judy hires private detective Vincent Noonan (Stewart) to kill Casper for the fee of $1000, plus expenses, but the death must appear to be accidental. Noonan moves into the mansion, pretending to be Judy's cousin, and he accidentally sickens himself after he pours ant poison on the filet steak that he thinks will go to Casper but that goes to him instead. Noonan tries to kill him in a boat, but the dog saves his life, leaving him a loyal defender of Casper. Judy concludes that the only way to get the Craig fortune is to marry Casper herself, so she confides in a psychiatrist (Roberts) that she has decided to become a dog herself. Supporting Cast: Almira Sessions as Housekeeper Martha Henderson, Harry Tyler (credited as Harry O. Tyler) as Sam Loomis, Joseph Holland as Estate Attorney, Maurice Manson as Hunter, Stephen Roberts as Psychiatrist, Red as Casper
177	24	"Madame Mystery"	John Brahm	Story by : Robert Bloch; Teleplay by : William Fay	Audrey Totter as Betsy Blake, Joby Baker as Jimmy Dolan	March 27, 1960
Writer Steven (McGuire) is interrupted by a soaking-wet new actress, Lois (Welles), who fell into the nearby ocean and desires a blanket. Twenty-three-year-old Hollywood PR man Jimmy Dolan (Baker) enters raving over a conversation he had with a studio boss about exploiting the death of aged alcoholic movie star Betsy Blake (Totter) from a boat accident in order to create a massive publicity campaign (comparable to that of Rudolph Valentino's death) and advance his career. Jimmy pays Steven $300 to write a screenplay regarding the incident and her life. Alfredo (Ragan) stops by to share "love secrets from beyond the grave" to help the script. However, three months later (on the eve of the release), Betsy returns, alive and ready to take advantage of her new "legend". Betsy, after a few drinks, reveals that the incident was planned both to give her a vacation break and build up her image. Jimmy, distraught at having his success overshadowed, kills her by pushing her from a balcony down to the beach during an argument. Jimmy goes to Steven and offers $5000 to help him cover it up, but Steven calls the police. Jimmy then reveals that Betsy was his mother. Supporting Cast: Harp McGuire as Steven, Mike Ragan as Alfredo, Meri Welles as Lois
178	25	"The Little Man Who Was There"	George Stevens, Jr.	Gordon Russell & Larry Ward	Norman Lloyd as the Little Man, Arch Johnson as Jaime McMahon, Read Morgan as Ben McMahon	April 3, 1960
Miners Hutch (Hoyt) and Pete (Ragan) argue about paying for drinks while the saloonkeeper (Armstrong) works to keep the peace. Newcomers Jamie (Johnson) and Ben McMahon (Morgan) have civilized the unruly community of Copperpocket and gained everyone's respect, so they end up resolving the dispute with their "brotherly love". They even manage to help a slot machine player (Christi) strike it rich. Strong miners, such as Swede (Cooper), compete to lift an anvil, but Ben and Jaime are the only ones who can do it. One night a mysterious man (Lloyd) appears and is told the story of the brothers by the saloonkeeper. The man calls the brothers cowards due to their relying upon scripture and challenges them to fight him. He shows seemingly demonic powers to prevent the brothers from striking him and then takes everyone's money, including the saloonkeeper's, totaling $30,000. The saloonkeeper and piano player (Ates) believe that the man was the devil himself. However, it was all a confidence scheme performed by the man and the brothers together, and they each pocket $10,000. They then decide to go to Silverwheel, Nevada to continue their scam. Supporting Cast: Clegg Hoyt as Hutch, Clancy Cooper as Swede, Roscoe Ates as Piano Player, Robert Armstrong as Saloonkeeper, Mike Ragan as Pete, Frank Christi as Slot Machine Player, Chick Hannan as Townsman (uncredited), Harry Raven as Townsman (uncredited), Bill Borzage as Townsman (uncredited), Mathew McCue as Townsman (uncredited), Al Roberts as Townsman (uncredited), Martin Strader as Townsman (uncredited)
179	26	"Mother, May I Go Out to Swim?"	Herschel Daugherty	Story by : Q. Patrick; Teleplay by : James Cavanagh	William Shatner as John Crane, Jessie Royce Landis as Claire Crane, Gia Scala as Lottie Rank	April 10, 1960
John Crane (Shatner) narrates from a courtroom how he ultimately committed a murder while a court clerk (Elson) outlines the details of the case. John flashes back to when he met his German lover Lottie (Scala) while buying a gift for his mother Claire (Landis). Lottie leads him on a walk to a secluded waterfall where she discusses her childhood and losing her parents, while John mentions how he lost his father but was left financially well off. The two of them dance (she cures his phobia regarding dancing) and discuss marriage, but John flees when he realizes that he has not contacted his mother (who is waiting for him). Claire goes to see Lottie at her job and questions whether Lottie is trying to wed to obtain American citizenship, but she does not reveal her identity as John's mother. He has an unnaturally close relationship with his mother, calling her 'Claire' instead of mother and mentioning her constantly. This worries Lottie when they later meet for tea. Lottie suggests taking Claire to their favorite spot by a waterfall to tell her of their intent to marry. However, John believes this is Lottie's suggestion that they should kill Claire, and John pushes Lottie off the cliff instead. The inquest board chairman (Carson) rules that Lottie's death was accidental. Supporting Cast: Bob Carson (credited as Robert Carson) as Inquest Board Chairman, Donald Elson as Court Clerk, William Meader as Inquest Board Member (uncredited) Interesting Note: Jessie Royce Landis (February 2) and Gia Scala (April 30) both died in 1972; William Meeder (April 15) and Bob Carson (June 2) both died in 1979, respectively.
180	27	"The Cuckoo Clock"	John Brahm	Story by : Frank Mace; Teleplay by : Robert Bloch	Beatrice Straight as Ida Blythe, Fay Spain as Madeleine Hall, Donald Buka as the Mental Patient at the door	April 17, 1960
Ida Blythe (Straight) and her daughter Dorothy (Hitchcock) travel out to a family cottage one year after the death of Ida's husband from a heart attack. They stop at the local general store to speak with storekeeper Burt (Beddoe), who informs them of an escaped mental patient from the local institution. Ida is staying alone at her cottage, despite Dorothy protesting, to clean while waiting for an acquaintance to visit. While obtaining firewood during a storm, a woman named Madeleine (Spain) sneaks into Ida's cottage, claiming that she was followed by the patient while out hiking. Madeleine's rambling about psychologists and incessant desire to be alone to paint scares Ida, as well as Madeleine's comparison of Ida to her aunt, whom she says is filled with hate (which is triggered by the sounds of the cuckoo clock). When a man (Buka) knocks on the door to tell her about the female runaway patient, Ida opens the door and shoves Madeleine to the ground, knocking her unconscious. However, the man is the real patient and he goes insane at the sound of the cuckoo clock, smashing it on the ground. Hitchcock later mentioned that the next house that the mental patient stopped at was more hospitable for that house belonged to the sheriff. Supporting Cast: Pat Hitchcock as Dorothy, Don Beddoe as Burt
181	28	"Forty Detectives Later"	Arthur Hiller	Henry Slesar	James Franciscus as William Tyre, Jack Weston as Otto	April 24, 1960
Private investigator William Tyre (Franciscus) narrates being hired (for $50 per day, plus expenses) by Munro Dean (Mitchell) to lure a bookstore worker named Otto (Weston) to a hotel room so that Dean can meet him and confirm his identity. Dean believes that Otto killed his wife in 1948, and he wants revenge. Tyre goes to the bookstore and spies as Otto fights with a disgruntled customer (Kelljan) over the quality of Paris postcards. Tyre then greets and convinces Otto to meet with him in private by discussing shared musical interests, but Otto invites Tyre to his home instead. When he meets afterward with Dean, Dean tries to give him a revolver and pleads with Tyre to kill Otto for five thousand dollars, but Tyre demurs and only accepts $112 for two days plus expenses. Tyre visits Otto's home and listens to music with Otto's girlfriend Gloria (McQuade), and then he convinces Otto to go to Dean's hotel room in order to purchase Otto's 200-plus record collection for $250. Tyre follows through but has a change of heart and goes to the room just as Dean and Otto shoot each other, and Otto even takes a shot at Tyre. While dying, Otto admits to Tyre that he killed Dean's wife, but that he was hired by Dean to do it. Dean has been trying to kill him ever since because of the nightmares he has had and doesn't want Otto to potentially testify against him. Supporting Cast: George Mitchell as Munro Dean, Arlene McQuade as Gloria, Robert Kelljan (credited as Robert Kelljian) as Book Store Customer
182	29	"The Hero"	John Brahm	Story by : Henry De Vere Stacpoole; Teleplay by : Bill S. Ballinger	Eric Portman as Sir Richard Musgrave, Oskar Homolka as Jan Vander Klaue / Mr. A.J. Keyser	May 1, 1960
Sir Richard Musgrave (Portman) takes a cruise to South Africa with his wife (Tedrow) and daughter while being photographed and interviewed (Lupino). He believes that he sees a former business partner, Jan Vander Klaue (Homolka), and inquires with the bartender (Bernard) as to the man's identity. Sir Richard meets with fellow businesspeople Janet Boswell (Windust) and Henry Caldwell (Robinson), as well as the ship's purser (Clanton), while working to get closer to the man in question, for whom he leaves a note to meet him urgently. Sir Richard thought that he had killed Vander Klaue years ago, and he receives an October 1939 South African newspaper clipping of Vander Klaue's supposed death slid under his cabin door. Sir Richard inquires with the steward (Harvey) about Keyser's communications and finally confronts him on the deck alone. Sir Richard explains what happened from his viewpoint and offers to pay Keyser five hundred thousand pounds to keep him quiet (as he has made millions from their investments) so that he can earn a peerage the next year. Keyser goes to Sir Richard's cabin and tells him the story of a prospector (Vander Klaue) with 75 British pounds for his wife's operation. When the money was lost in the fight with an English partner (Sir Richard), the wife died. Upon learning that he was also responsible for the death of Vander Klaue's wife, Sir Richard drunkenly jumps overboard. Vander Klaue seemingly tries to save Sir Richard, but in actuality drowns him, though he is afterward hailed as a hero for his "attempt" by the ship's captain (Livesey). Supporting Cast: Irene Tedrow as Lady Musgrave, Bartlett Robinson as Henry Caldwell, Irene Windust as Janet Boswell, Ralph Clanton as Ship's Purser, Jack Livesey as Ship's Captain, Richard Lupino as Press Photographer, Barry Bernard as Bartender, Barry Harvey as Steward (uncredited) Note: The actress who played the Musgrave daughter is uncredited and currently unknown.
183	30	"Insomnia"	John Brahm	Henry Slesar	Dennis Weaver as Charles 'Charlie' Morton Cavender	May 8, 1960
Charles 'Charlie' Cavender (Weaver), a World War II air veteran, suffers from insomnia, caused by his fear of his brother-in-law and fellow veteran, John 'Jack' Fletcher (Ragin). Charlie's wife Linda was killed in a house fire and her brother, Jack, believes that Charlie let her die. Charlie visits Doctor Tebaldi (Millhollin) and chats with his receptionist (Lord) before discussing the nature of his problem, as he can only sleep for an hour or so at a time and has lost several jobs recently following his wife's death. He outlines the nightmare that he has repeatedly about the house fire, and then he details the events of the actual fire and how he escaped. He admits to his fear of Jack and how the insomnia actually began after Jack left Dover Veterans' Hospital in Maryland. That night, Jack calls Charlie and implies threats. The next day, Charlie is fired by his boss Mr. Turney (Hodge). Charlie calls the veteran's hospital to get Jack's apartment address, and then he confronts Jack, who is in a wheelchair. Jack desires to be Charlie's "official nightmare", and after Charlie laughs at him, Jack pulls a gun. After a struggle, Jack is shot and killed. That night Charlie sleeps peacefully and does not wake up when his heater catches aflame and burns his apartment building down. The fire captain (Gilman) and a fireman (Clark) discuss how Charlie must have been a heavy sleeper to be the only fatality from the fire. Supporting Cast: John S. Ragin as Jack Fletcher, James Millhollin as Doctor Tebaldi, Al Hodge as Mr. Turney, Sam Gilman as Fire Captain Frank, Ken Clark as Fireman, Dorothea Lord as Receptionist
184	31	"I Can Take Care of Myself"	Alan Crosland, Jr.	Story by : Fred McMorrow; Teleplay by : Thomas Grant	Myron McCormick as Bert Haber, Linda Lawson as Georgia	May 15, 1960
Bert Haber (McCormick) is a piano player in a club and is friends with singer Georgia (Lawson). He and owner Joey (Kuluva) discuss Georgia's problems with gangster "Little Dandy" Dorf (Darro) at the end of a show. Dorf harasses Georgia after she rejects flowers sent by his henchman (Sharon) and she pours a drink over Dorf's head, humiliating him. When he attempts to assault her, Haber intervenes. A man (Harrington) whom Bert takes to be an insurance man then approaches him and spills Bert's personal details, telling him that Little Dandy recommends he buy insurance. The next day, a detective claiming the name "Jack Simpson" (Ryan) informs Bert that Georgia has been killed by showing him a crime-scene photograph of her face and then questions him about taking Georgia home the previous night. While they speak in private, Bert's friend and co-worker Amos (Weinrib) brings another singer in to audition. The detective discovers that Bert knows enough information to have Little Dandy arrested. However, the "detective" is one of Little Dandy's goons, and he takes Bert away as Amos plays the piano. The "insurance man" is sitting in the backseat with a gun and is revealed to be the goon's partner. Supporting Cast: Frankie Darro as Little Dandy Dorf, Edmon Ryan as "Detective" Jack Simpson, Will Kuluva as Joey, Lennie Weinrib as Amos, Pat Harrington, Jr. as Insurance Man, William Sharon as Henchman with Flowers
185	32	"One Grave Too Many"	Arthur Hiller	Story by : Henry Slesar; Teleplay by : Eli Jerome	Neile Adams as Irene Helmer, Jeremy Slate as Joe Helmer, Biff Elliot as Lieutenant Bates, Howard McNear as Mr. Pickett	May 22, 1960
Married couple Irene (Adams) and Joe Helmer (Slate) are in dire financial straits, with their electricity being cut off for lack of payment (for three months) and Joe unable to collect more unemployment. Joe goes to get a $100 loan from a loan company, but he is turned down by the loan officer (McNear) as he has no collateral, no co-signer, and no consistent employment. That night Joe sees a man (Bradley) collapse on the sidewalk and, thinking him dead, steals his wallet filled with $275 and his identity listed as Marvin Horn. He tells Irene that he ran into an old army friend who owed him money and simply got repaid. When he goes to get dressed to go out to dinner for a celebration with Irene, Joe finds a card in the man's wallet stating that the man suffered from a cataleptic illness that only looks like death. Joe returns to the scene but is told by a patrolman (Carlile) that the man has indeed died. Joe calls the police to report that the man is not dead but refuses to give personal details. He ultimately goes to the police to confess to the desk sergeant (McVey), whom he had previously called, and save the man, only to learn from Lieutenant Bates (Elliot) that the man was transported to the morgue. At the morgue, Joe learns that the dead man is a pickpocket named Sonny Boy Capper and that the wallet was stolen from someone else. Supporting Cast: Paul Bradley as Sonny Boy Capper (the elderly collapsed man), Tyler McVey as Desk Sergeant, David Carlile as Patrolman
186	33	"Party Line"	Hilton A. Green	Story by : Henry Slesar; Teleplay by : Eli Jerome	Judy Canova as Helen Parch, Royal Dano as Mr. Atkins, Arch Johnson as Heywood Miller	May 29, 1960
Helen Parch (Canova) enjoys abusing the party line and eavesdropping on other people's telephone calls. She especially is fond of listening to the gossip calls of her "friends" Emma (Corby) and Betty (Flynn). One day she is warned by police officer Mr. Atkins (Dano) that a man named Heywood Miller (Johnson) escaped prison after six years and may come after her. Years ago, Helen even listened in on Miller's gambling calls and confronted him in the neighborhood shop of Mr. Maynard (Knight). Afterward, Helen refused to let Heywood use the party line to call the doctor, staying on the line with her since-departed forgetful friend Gertrude (Grace), which led to the death of Miller's pregnant wife. Afterward, Miller began a career of burglaries, leading to his prison sentence. That night, after Atkins leaves, Heywood breaks into Helen's house basement, and when she tries to call the sheriff's office, the party line is busy with Emma and Betty, who refuse to get off the phone. Supporting Cast: Ted Knight as Mr. Maynard, Ellen Corby as Emma, Gertrude Flynn as Betty Nubbins, Charity Grace as Gertrude Anderson
187	34	"Cell 227"	Paul Henreid	Story by : Bryce Walton; Teleplay by : Bill S. Ballinger	Brian Keith as Herbert 'Herbie' Morrison, James Best as Hennessy	June 5, 1960
Prisoner De Baca (Ponti) is desperate for a stay of execution, with prisoners Hennessy (Best), Holt (Raybould), and others seeking to give him hope, while former English literature Professor and fellow inmate Herbert 'Herbie' Morrison (Keith) braces him for reality. Guards Pops Lafferty (Westerfield) and Callahan (Mims) escort De Baca to the death chamber while Father McCann (Sullivan) gives him last rites. Morrison is on death row for murder and wants to die with dignity, refusing his lawyer Maury Berg's (Maxwell) attempt for a stay of execution and only desiring a full pardon. Morrison appreciates how those on the outside don't know their scheduled time, place, and manner of death. Guard Lafferty is helpful and optimistic, while guard Callahan constantly berates him. When Herbert is taken to the gas chamber, he kills guard Lafferty and is taken away. Afterward, Warden Elvery (Carson) tells Herbert that his lawyer Berg obtained a stay and found a witness to clear his name, but since Herbert killed Lafferty, he will never be pardoned. Supporting Cast: James Westerfield as Pops Lafferty, Bob Carson (credited as Robert Carson) as Warden Elvery, Frank Maxwell as Maury Berg, Liam Sullivan as Father McCann, Sal Ponti as De Baca, Harry Raybould as Holt, William Mims as Guard Callahan (uncredited)
188	35	"The Schartz-Metterklume Method"	Richard Dunlap	Story by : Saki; Teleplay by : Marian Cockrell	Hermione Gingold as "Miss Hope" / Lady Charlotte	June 12, 1960
England. Miss Hope (Gingold) is traveling by train when she steps off and intervenes with a man, Ben Huggins (Drayton), mistreating his horse Nobby; she purchases the horse for ten British pounds and renames him Ferdinand. Just as the train starts off again, leaving her stranded at the train station, Mrs. Wellington (March) arrives to pick up whom she believes to be the new governess, Miss Hope, from the station. She is quickly thrown by Miss Hope's outspokenness and desire to speak Russian, in addition to French, to the children of the household. Mrs. Wellington expects Miss Hope to be more open and modern, but she herself is quite stuffy towards the nannie (Lloyd), driver Simpson, maid Rose (Hitchcock), and even Miss Hope. For the next few days Miss Hope teaches the Wellington children {Viola (V. Cartwright), Irenee (A. Cartwright), Claude, and Wilfred} biology (reproduction from studying frogs) and history (through the Schartz-Metterklume Method: to make children learn history by acting it out themselves) with enthusiasm. However, Mrs. Wellington, husband John (Conway), and even the vicar (Innocent) are all appalled by her straightforward, unorthodox methods, and Mrs. Wellington fires her. Miss Hope leaves in good spirits though, because she is actually wealthy aristocrat Lady Charlotte; Mrs. Wellington mistook her for Miss Hope, and Lady Charlotte enjoyed the simple distraction and experience. Just as Lady Charlotte arrives at the train station after saying farewell to Huggins, she encounters the real Miss Hope and advises her to wait before traveling to the Wellington home. Lady Charlotte then travels by train to visit her friend Jenny (Varden), a lawn party hostess, in order to cheerfully play croquet and reunite with her cheetah cub Rover. Supporting Cast: Elspeth March as Mrs. Wellington, Pat Hitchcock as Rose, Noel Drayton as Ben Huggins, Doris Lloyd as Nannie, Tom Conway as John Wellington (uncredited), Veronica Cartwright as Viola Wellington (uncredited), Angela Cartwright as Irenee Wellington (uncredited), Norma Varden as Jenny (uncredited), Harold Innocent as Vicar (uncredited) Note: The child actors who played Claude and Wilfred Wellington, the actor who played driver Simpson, the actress who played the actual Miss Hope, and the speaking actor who appeared at the lawn party are all uncredited and currently unknown.
189	36	"Letter of Credit"	Paul Henreid	Helen Nielsen	Bob Sweeney as William Spengler, Robert Bray as Henry Taylor Lowden	June 19, 1960
Henry Taylor Lowden (Bray) visits Kirkland and gets information from the station master (Hamilton) about the town, strangers, and the local bank. Henry visits Kirkland Mercantile Bank and gets bank information from Miss Foster (Holt) as elderly Josiah Wingate (Delevanti), the bank founder and father-in-law of the bank president, is wheeled from the bank. Henry wants to question its president, William Spengler (Sweeney), claiming that he is called Henry Taylor and is writing a book on bank crimes. Three years before a bank employee, Arnold Mathias (Nicholas), was convicted of stealing $200,000 from the bank, and Arnold recently died in a prison escape attempt, though his cellmate made it out. Only bank president Spengler and vice president Sam Kern (Newton) had keys to the strongbox, and both were supposedly gone when the theft occurred. Henry questions William aggressively, believing that Arnold was framed (as he didn't flee and had no place to stash the money) and that William stole the money (as William made it so that he was alone in the bank for several minutes). Henry details to William how he knows that William's marriage was unhappy, the phone call he had Kern make was an unnecessary ruse, and how his life was less ideal than presented. Henry firmly states that the money is in William's safety deposit box and then Henry pulls a revolver to pressure William. William, believing that Henry is Arnold's escaped cellmate Thomas Henry (a murderer), tries to make a deal with him and confesses, but Henry is actually the police officer who killed Arnold and is trying to make amends by arresting the true culprit. Supporting Cast: Theodore Newton as Sam Kern, Cyril Delevanti as Josiah Wingate, Ronald Nicholas as Arnold Mathias, Jacqueline Holt as Miss Foster, Joseph Hamilton as Station Master
190	37	"Escape to Sonoita"	Stuart Rosenberg	Story by : James A. Howard; Teleplay by : James A. Howard & Bill S. Ballinger	Burt Reynolds as Bill Davis, Murray Hamilton as Marsh, Harry Dean Stanton as Lemon, James Bell as Andy Davis	June 26, 1960
Father Andy (Bell) and son Bill Davis (Reynolds) break down in the desert when their radiator overheats in their tanker truck that was converted to carry water instead of oil. Criminals Marsh (Hamilton) and Lemon (Stanton) try to pass by when their drive shaft breaks. They reveal a kidnapped woman, Stephanie Thomas (Stevenson), and $100,000 that they stole. Marsh, the brains of the operation, is focused on the money, while Lemon is obsessed with Thomas. They then steal the tanker to escape across the border to Sonoita and leave the others to die, unaware that Andy and Bill know how to survive in the desert and leaving Thomas to supposedly die with them. Andy knows that they can drink the gallons of water in the radiator and Bill knows how to start a signal fire and store water in the car tire's inner tube. The next day police patrolmen (Karnes and Dockstader) find Lemon's body, with him having been shot in the head. They then find the tanker broken down, along with Marsh's body. The kidnappers turned on each other when their water ran out, not realizing that the Davises' tanker was carrying water (as it was still labelled as an oil tanker). Supporting Cast: Venetia Stevenson as Stephanie Thomas, Robert Karnes as Patrolman, George Dockstader as Patrolman
191	38	"Hooked"	Norman Lloyd	Story by : Robert Turner; Teleplay by : Thomas Grant	Robert Horton as Ray Marchand, Vivienne Segal as Gladys, Anne Francis as Nyla Foster	September 25, 1960
Ray (Horton) stops by a boat rental shop to pick up his wife and becomes enamored with Nyla Foster (Francis), a college student working over the summer for her father (Holland). Ray is married to an older woman, Gladys (Segal), but he has dalliances with younger women (of which Gladys is aware but keeps him close with a weekly allowance). Nyla resists his attentions, but she also gives him the slightest glimmer of hope, and this inspires Ray to kill Gladys so they can be together. Ray learns the basics of freshwater fishing (Gladys' favorite hobby), but he has to put up with Mr. Foster always joining them and must bide his time. One day Ray finally takes Gladys fishing alone, hoping to drown her as she drops the anchor (as she cannot swim), but Gladys knocks him out first with a leather sap (placed in a picnic basket by Nyla) and throws him overboard. It was all planned by Gladys, Nyla, and her father, because Gladys and Mr. Foster are lovers and want to get married. Supporting Cast: John Holland as Mr. Foster
