= Wicked as They Come =

1956 British film by Ken Hughes

- Theatrical release poster
- Directed by: Ken Hughes
- Written by: Ken Hughes; Sigmund Miller; Robert Westerby
- Based on: novel Portrait in Smoke by Bill S. Ballinger
- Produced by: Maxwell Setton
- Starring: Arlene Dahl; Philip Carey; Herbert Marshall
- Cinematography: Basil Emmott
- Edited by: Max Benedict
- Music by: Malcolm Arnold
- Production company: Film Locations
- Distributed by: Columbia Pictures
- Release dates: 22 May 1956 (UK); February 1956 (US)
- Running time: 94 minutes
- Country: United Kingdom
- Language: English

Wicked as They Come is a 1956 British film noir directed by Ken Hughes and starring Arlene Dahl, Philip Carey and Herbert Marshall. It is based on the 1950 novel Portrait in Smoke by Bill S. Ballinger. The novel was also adapted for TV in 1950.

== Plot ==
Poor girl from the slums Katherine Allenborg trades on her looks. She enters a beauty contest, then charms the elderly gentleman running it, Sam Lewis, into fixing it so she will win first prize, a trip to Europe. She promptly abandons Sam.

On a plane to London, after changing her name to Kathy Allen, she is attracted to Tim O'Bannion, who works for an ad agency. However, she is determined to land someone wealthier, and photographer Larry Buckham, whom she meets at her London hotel, fits the bill. Invited to use his charge account at a department store for a wedding dress, Kathy makes many purchases, pawns the merchandise, and leaves Larry without a word.

She gets a job at Tim's advertising firm and seduces Stephen Collins, the man who runs it, and who is married. Tim arouses passion in her, but Kathy is strictly out for herself. She demands that Collins divorce his wife Virginia, whose father John Dowling owns the agency. Virginia tries to pay her off, but Kathy requests a transfer to the agency's Paris headquarters, where she immediately uses her wiles to get Dowling to marry her.

Anonymous threats begin by mail and phone, and someone in the shadows begins stalking her. Kathy picks up a gun and shoots through the door, accidentally killing her husband. No one believes her tale of a prowler and Kathy is tried, convicted, and sentenced to death.

Realising Larry is the prowler, Tim reveals to him something he has only just discovered, an explanation for Kathy's cold treatment of men: when she was a teenager, she was brutally assaulted. Larry has a change of heart and confesses to stalking her. Kathy's sentence is reduced to time in prison, and she hopes Tim will give her another chance once she gets out.

== Cast ==
- Arlene Dahl as Katrin Alanborg/Kathy Allen
- Philip Carey as Tim O'Bannion
- Herbert Marshall as Stephen Collins
- Michael Goodliffe as Larry Buckham
- Ralph Truman as John Dowling
- Sid James as Frank Alanborg
- David Kossoff as Sam Lewis
- Faith Brook as Virginia Collins
- Frederick Valk as Mr Reisner
- Marvin Kane as Mike Lewis
- Patrick Allen as Willie
- Gil Winfield as Chuck
- Jacques B. Brunius as Inspector Caron

== Production ==
In May 1955 it was announced that Mike Frankovich had purchased the screen rights to the novel, to be made under his deal with Columbia. It was the third property Frankovich had purchased, the others being Joe MacBeth and ''Wise Guys Never Work. The film would be made by an associated company, Film Locations, run by Maxwell Setton.

Laurence Harvey was offered a lead role but turned it down. Lead roles eventually went to Arlene Dahl, Phil Carey and Herbert Marshall.

Filming was to have started in London on 28 November 1955 but eventually started on 2 December, under the working title Portrait in Smoke.

== Lawsuit ==
In March 1957 Arlene Dahl filed suit against Columbia for $1,000,000 claiming the advertising for the film was "obscene, degrading and offensive." She said she was humiliated by the use of composite drawings and photographs advertising the film. The case went to trial in May. The judge was unsympathetic during the hearing, saying he felt the photograph was refined. The case was dismissed in August.

== Critical reception ==
The Monthly Film Bulletin wrote: "This is a rather disagreeable film. The story is a novelettish 'shocker', and the heroine's appalling morals are glibly excused on the grounds that she was attacked when a young girl. This seems a disappointing film to come from Ken Hughes, who has shown signs of developing into an interesting director. Arlene Dahl hardly suggests a convincing femme fatale, and the acting generally is no more than adequate."

The Los Angeles Times said it was "written and directed with humor as well as ironic drama".

In British Sound Films: The Studio Years 1928–1959 David Quinlan rated the film as "mediocre", writing: "Thirties-style story (cf Baby Face [1933]) looks thin; not played with much flair."

Filmink said "The film would have been better off following the lead of the poster art rather than the script: at heart this should have been a campy Joan Crawford vehicle but it's far too reticent and dull."

British film critic Leslie Halliwell said: "Busy melodrama which interests without edifying."
