= The Manchurian Candidate (1962 film) =

American thriller by John Frankenheimer

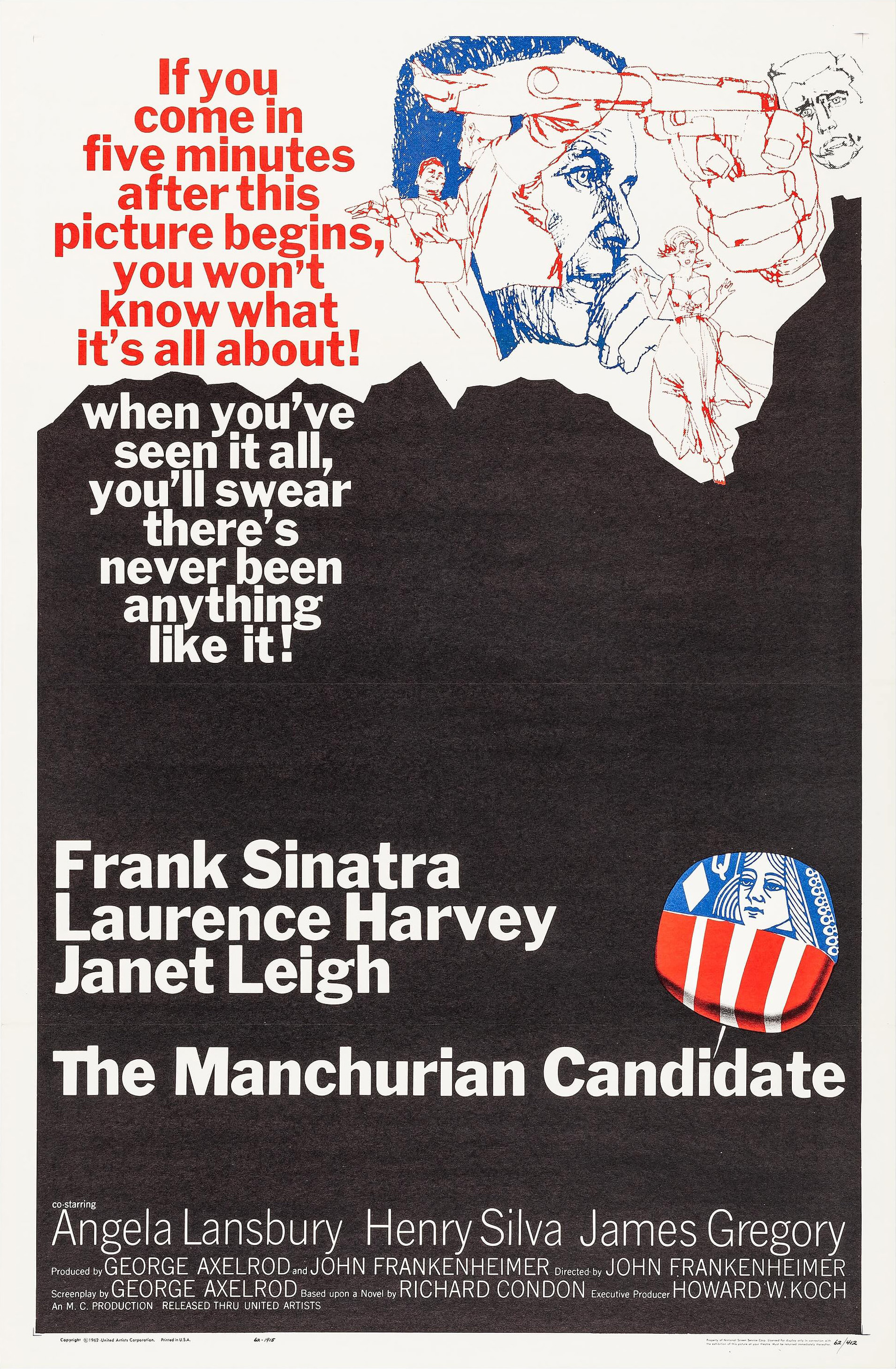
- Theatrical release poster
- Directed by: John Frankenheimer
- Screenplay by: George Axelrod
- Based on: The Manchurian Candidate; 1959 novel by Richard Condon
- Produced by: George Axelrod; John Frankenheimer
- Starring: Frank Sinatra; Laurence Harvey; Janet Leigh; Angela Lansbury; Henry Silva; James Gregory
- Narrated by: Paul Frees
- Cinematography: Lionel Lindon
- Edited by: Ferris Webster
- Music by: David Amram
- Color process: Black and white
- Production company: M.C. Productions
- Distributed by: United Artists
- Release date: October 24, 1962
- Running time: 126 minutes
- Country: United States
- Language: English
- Budget: $2.2 million
- Box office: $3.3 million (rentals, (Note: Please note these are distributor rentals only, their share of the box office gross after theatres take their cut of gross ticket sales) original release) $7.7 million (gross, including re-releases)

The film's trailer

The Manchurian Candidate is a 1962 American psychological political thriller film directed and produced by John Frankenheimer. The screenplay is by George Axelrod, based on the 1959 Richard Condon novel The Manchurian Candidate. The film's leading actors are Frank Sinatra, Laurence Harvey, and Janet Leigh, with co-stars Angela Lansbury, Henry Silva, and James Gregory.

The plot centers on Korean War veteran Raymond Shaw, part of a prominent political family. Shaw is brainwashed by communists after his Army platoon is captured. He returns to civilian life in the United States, where he becomes an unwitting assassin in an international communist conspiracy. The group, which includes representatives of the People’s Republic of China and the Soviet Union, plans to assassinate the presidential nominee of an American political party, with the death leading to the overthrow of the U.S. government.

The film was released in the United States on October 24, 1962, at the height of U.S.–Soviet hostility during the Cuban Missile Crisis. It was widely acclaimed by Western critics and was nominated for two Academy Awards: Best Supporting Actress (Angela Lansbury) and Best Editing. Lansbury also won the Golden Globe Award for Best Supporting Actress. It was selected in 1994 for preservation in the United States National Film Registry by the Library of Congress as being "culturally, historically, or aesthetically significant".

== Plot ==
During the Korean War, Soviet and Chinese soldiers capture a U.S. Army platoon, taking them to communist China. Three days later, Sergeant Raymond Shaw and Captain Bennett "Ben" Marco return to UN lines. Upon Marco's recommendation, Shaw is awarded the Medal of Honor for saving his soldiers' lives in combat, though two men were killed. Shaw returns to the United States, where his mother, Eleanor Iselin, exploits his heroism to further the political career of her husband, Senator John Iselin. When asked to describe Shaw, two soldiers in his unit uniformly respond that "he is the kindest, bravest, warmest, most wonderful human being [they] have ever known." In actuality, Shaw is a strict, cold, unsympathetic loner hated by his men.

After Marco is promoted to major and assigned to Army Intelligence, he has a recurring nightmare: a hypnotized Shaw blithely murders two soldiers from his platoon before an assembly of communist military leaders to demonstrate their revolutionary brainwashing technique.

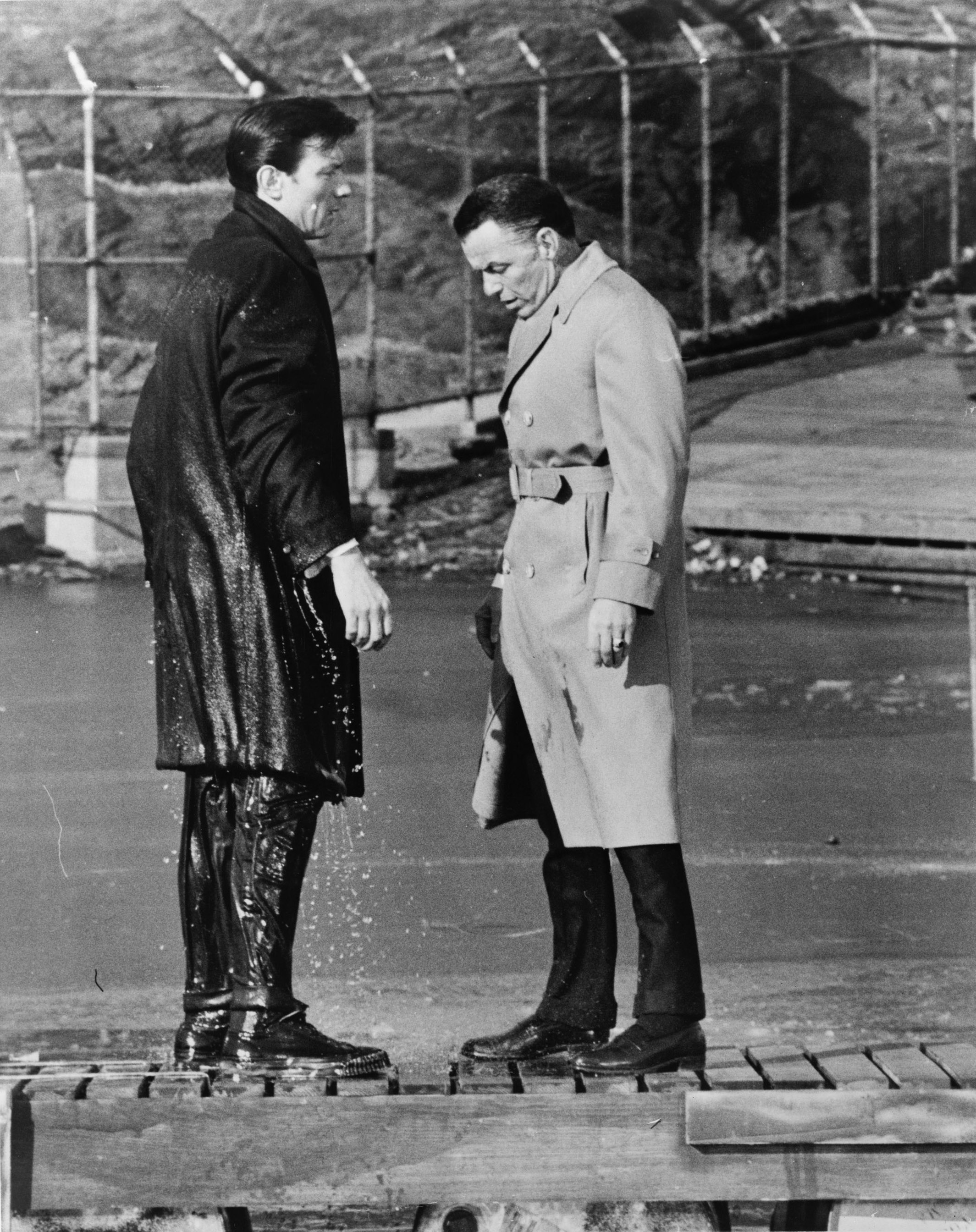
Shaw with Major Marco after jumping into a lake in Central Park when his programming was accidentally triggered

Unbeknownst to him, during captivity, Shaw was programmed as a sleeper agent, who obeys orders to kill and immediately forgets having done so. His heroism is a false memory implanted during the brainwashing. Agents trigger Shaw by suggesting he play solitaire; the queen of diamonds activates him. Meanwhile, Eleanor is masterminding John's political ascent with his baseless claims that communists work at the Defense Department (a clear parallel to the demagogic activities of Senator Joseph R. McCarthy in the early 1950s). To spite his mother and stepfather, Shaw takes a job at a newspaper published by Holborn Gaines, Iselin's harshest critic. Communist agents later have Shaw murder Gaines to confirm that his brainwashing still works.

Chunjin, a North Korean agent who posed as a guide for Shaw's platoon, arrives at Shaw's apartment asking for work. The unsuspecting Shaw hires him as a valet and cook. Marco recognizes Chunjin when he visits Shaw; he violently attacks him and demands to know what happened during the platoon's captivity. After Marco is arrested for assault, Eugenie "Rosie" Cheyney, an attractive young woman he met on the train, posts his bail. Marco learns that Allen Melvin, a fellow soldier, has the same nightmare. When Melvin and Marco separately identify identical photos of the two male communist leaders from their dreams, Army Intelligence agrees to investigate.

Shaw rekindles a romance with Jocelyn Jordan, the daughter of liberal Senator Thomas Jordan, the Iselins' chief political foe. Eleanor wants to garner Senator Jordan's support for Iselin's vice-presidential bid. Unswayed, Jordan insists he will oppose the nomination. After Jocelyn inadvertently triggers Shaw's programming by wearing a Queen of Diamonds costume at the Iselins' fancy-dress party, they elope. Furious at Senator Jordan's rebuff, Eleanor—who is Shaw's American "operator" (handler)—sends him to kill Senator Jordan at his home. Shaw also kills Jocelyn when she inadvertently happens upon the murder scene. Having no memory of the killing, Shaw is grief-stricken upon learning they are dead.

After discovering the queen of diamonds card's role in Shaw's conditioning, Marco uses a forcing deck to deprogram him, hoping to learn Shaw's next assignment. Eleanor primes Shaw to assassinate their party's presidential nominee during the convention so that Iselin, as the vice-presidential candidate, will become the nominee by default. In the uproar, he will seek emergency powers to establish a strict authoritarian regime. Eleanor tells Shaw that she had requested a programmed assassin, never knowing it would be her own son. When taking power, she vows revenge upon her superiors for choosing him.

Disguised as a priest, Shaw enters Madison Square Garden, taking a sniper's position in a vacant overhead spotlight booth. Marco and his supervisor, Colonel Milt, race to the convention to stop Shaw. At the last moment, Shaw aims away from the presidential nominee and instead kills Senator Iselin and Eleanor. When Marco bursts into the booth, Shaw, wearing the Medal of Honor, says he was the only one who could stop his mother and stepfather, then kills himself. Later that evening with Rosie, Marco mourns Shaw's death.

== Cast ==
- Frank Sinatra as Major Bennett Marco
- Laurence Harvey as Raymond Shaw
- Janet Leigh as Eugenie Rose Cheyney
- Angela Lansbury as Eleanor Shaw Iselin
- Henry Silva as Chunjin
- James Gregory as Senator John Yerkes Iselin
- Leslie Parrish as Jocelyn Jordan
- John McGiver as Senator Thomas Jordan
- Khigh Dhiegh as Dr. Yen Lo
- James Edwards as Corporal Allen Melvin
- Douglas Henderson as Colonel Milt
- Albert Paulsen as Zilkov
- Barry Kelley as Secretary of Defense
- Lloyd Corrigan as Holborn Gaines
- Madame Spivy as Female Berezovo
- Reggie Nalder as Gomel (uncredited)

== Production ==
=== Development ===
George Axelrod was friends with John Frankenheimer and they were looking for a project to make after Frankeheimer had been removed as director of Breakfast at Tiffany's. Axelrod read a review of The Manchurian Candidate in the New Yorker, bought the book and he and Frankenheimer decided to turn it into a movie. "There was a lot of resistance," recalled Axelrod. "It was everything the studios didn't want—political satire, worse than regular satire. It was not easy, but [Frank] Sinatra made it all possible. Sinatra agreed to play [Bennett] Marco, and that's the only way United Artists would let us do it."

Axelrod called the original book "a brilliant, wildly chaotic novel. Wonderful voice. To take the essence of that and try to make it so that it worked for a film was a challenge." He said the screenplay "breaks every single known rule. It's got dream sequences, flashbacks, narration out of nowhere. When we got in trouble, it had just a voice explaining stuff. Everything in the world that you're told not to do. But that was part of its genetic code, the secret of the crossword puzzle. It worked for this script."

=== Casting ===
Nearly half the film's $2.2 million production budget went to Frank Sinatra's salary for his performance.

Frank Sinatra suggested Lucille Ball for the role of Eleanor Iselin, but Frankenheimer, who had worked with Lansbury in All Fall Down, insisted that Sinatra watch her performance in that film before a final choice was made. Although Lansbury played Raymond Shaw's mother, she was, in fact, only three years older than her on-screen son Laurence Harvey. An early scene in which Shaw, recently decorated with the Medal of Honor, argues with his parents, was filmed in Sinatra's own private plane.

Janet Leigh plays Marco's love interest. In a short biography of Leigh broadcast on Turner Classic Movies, her daughter, actress Jamie Lee Curtis, reveals that Leigh had been served divorce papers on behalf of her father, actor Tony Curtis, the morning that the scene where Marco and her character first meet on a train was filmed.

Sinatra offered Jackie Gleason a role in the film, but he declined as he was in need of rest after shooting two films back-to-back.

=== Filming ===
Principal photography took place on-location in New York City and at Samuel Goldwyn Studios in Los Angeles. Notable scenes were shot in Madison Square Garden and Central Park. Axelrod said all Sinatra's scenes had to be shot first because he was leaving to go to Europe.

In the scene where Marco attempts to deprogram Shaw in a hotel room opposite the convention, Sinatra is at times slightly out of focus. It was a first take, and Sinatra failed to be as effective in subsequent retakes, a common factor in his film performances. In the end, Frankenheimer elected to use the out-of-focus take. Critics subsequently praised him for showing Marco from Shaw's distorted point of view.

In the novel, Eleanor Iselin's father had sexually abused her as a child. Before the dramatic climax, she uses her son's brainwashing to have sex with him. Concerned with the reaction to even a reference to a taboo topic such as incest in a mainstream film at that time, the filmmakers instead had Eleanor kiss Shaw on the lips to imply her incestuous attraction to him.

The film's fight scene between Marco (Sinatra) and Chunjin (Silva) is notable as one of the earliest depictions of East Asian martial arts in a mainstream Hollywood film, with the last notable example occurring in 1945's Blood on the Sun. Sinatra broke his little finger while shooting the scene, and his refusal to properly bandage or cast his hand for the rest of filming would lead to chronic discomfort throughout his life. According to Frankenheimer, Henry Silva had to train himself to fight right-handed (he was actually left-handed) for the scene.

== Cold War ==
The Manchurian Candidate has been called one of the most "iconic" films of the Cold War period, especially in its discussion of "mind-control." With one of the major plot points being the popular Cold War myth that China was brainwashing US soldiers for communist purposes during the Korean War. Political scientist Michael Rogin further cements the film in this time period by describing it as being "a Kennedy Administration film." Rogin cites Sinatra's character within the film as being a "lonely Kennedy Hero," who works within the army bureaucracy towards reform.

=== Depiction of communists ===
In the garden scene, pictures of Mao Zedong and Joseph Stalin are hung on the wall with a Soviet star in between them and the head of the Manchurian candidates standing beneath the star. This insinuates a collaboration between China and Russia with the goal to manipulate the US for communist world domination. During their demonstration, the communist leaders refer to Raymond as "the mechanism" and "the weapon", which affirms the idea that communists only see people as gadgets that can be thrown away after their use. The film depicts communists as eager to give up their lives, which are expendable in their eyes anyway, for the cause of universal communism, which is a "less than essential end".

In The Manchurian Candidate, communists are not peers, but instead relate to each other within the hierarchy of communist leaders. For example, there are rows of communist leaders who all look down upon the Manchurian Candidates in the garden scene. In addition, Raymond Shaw’s mother only uses those around her, such as her son and husband, as pawns in her communist ploy to gain a powerful position through her husband’s candidacy for Vice President of the US. This is juxtaposed with loving, trusting, and open relationships such as those between Shaw and Jocelyn Jordan, and Marco and Cheyney.

=== Conspiracy theories and US mind control ===
The Manchurian Candidate uses "science, the conditioned subject, and the moving image" to create a realistic framework for the existence of mind control. Specifically, it plays on the idea of a "covert sphere" of communism within the US, mixing real life events with those out of science fiction. This theme added to the growing suspicion of the US government, redirecting concerns of possible brainwashing toward the homefront. Janja Lalich, a counter-cult sociologist, notes that the term "brainwashing" used by this counterculture movement was first made popular by The Manchurian Candidate. The ever growing fear that anyone, even a decorated soldier like Raymond Shaw, could be coerced unwittingly by communists contributed to the United States’ expansion of their own mind control experiments. In 1975, a little over ten years after the release of The Manchurian Candidate, the fear of a US-funded mind control scheme would come true with the reveal of Project MKUltra, in which the CIA looked to control human behavior through trauma programming and psychoactive drugs starting in the early 1950s and ending in 1973. According to the CIA, "historians have asserted that creating a 'Manchurian Candidate' subject through 'mind control' techniques was a goal of MK-ULTRA and related CIA projects."

Roger Ebert suggested that Leigh's character Rosie is intended as Marco's own controller, writing:

They meet in the parlor car of a train, where Sinatra, shaking, cannot light a cigarette and knocks over the table with his drink on it. Leigh follows him to the space between cars, lights a cigarette for him and engages him in a very weird conversation, after which they fall in love and she quickly ditches her fiancé. What’s going on here? My notion is that Sinatra’s character is a Manchurian killer, too – one allowed to remember details of Harvey’s brainwashing because that would make him seem more credible. And Leigh? She is Sinatra’s controller. This possible scenario simply adds another level to a movie already rich in intrigue.

== Reception ==
=== Box office ===
In the United States and Canada, for its original release, The Manchurian Candidate netted $3.3 million in distributor rentals, against a budget of $2.2 million. After Sinatra – who owned the film rights – allowed re-release in 1988, followed by other theatrical re-releases, the film has grossed $7.7 million.

=== Critical response ===
The Manchurian Candidate was praised by critics for its performances, direction, themes, satire, editing and visuals. On the review aggregator website Rotten Tomatoes, 96% of 68 critics' reviews are positive, with an average rating of 8.8/10. The website's consensus reads: "A classic blend of satire and political thriller that was uncomfortably prescient in its own time, The Manchurian Candidate remains distressingly relevant today." Metacritic, which uses a weighted average, assigned the film a score of 94 out of 100, based on 20 critics, indicating "universal acclaim".

Critic Pauline Kael attributed the strength of the film less to its directing than to the power of its script.

Writing an extensive retrospective analysis in 2003, film critic Roger Ebert addressed the many elements that led him to rate The Manchurian Candidate one of the 'Great Movies' – films he gave his maximum 4 stars out of 4; he declared it "inventive and frisky, takes enormous chances with the audience, and plays not like a 'classic', but as a work as alive and smart as when it was first released".

=== Academic response ===
Scholars have used The Manchurian Candidate as a window into Cold War paranoia. Professor Catherine Canino claimed that the film fulfilled the prophecies of "the imagined loss of cherished American autonomy and free will". Political scientist Michael Rogin concluded that The Manchurian Candidate "aims to reawaken a lethargic nation to a communist menace". Humanities Center director [Timothy Melley] argued that "The Manchurian Candidate's deepest worry is neither communism nor anticommunism but embattled human autonomy."

=== Awards and honours ===
Award	Category	Nominee(s)	Result
Academy Awards	Best Supporting Actress	Angela Lansbury	Nominated
Academy Awards	Best Film Editing	Ferris Webster	Nominated
British Academy Film Awards	Best Film from any Source		Nominated
Directors Guild of America Awards	Outstanding Directorial Achievement in Motion Pictures	John Frankenheimer	Nominated
Golden Globe Awards	Best Director – Motion Picture	John Frankenheimer	Nominated
Golden Globe Awards	Best Supporting Actress – Motion Picture	Angela Lansbury	Won
Laurel Awards	Top Action Drama		Nominated
Laurel Awards	Top Action Performance	Frank Sinatra	Nominated
Laurel Awards	Top Female Supporting Performance	Angela Lansbury	Nominated
National Board of Review Awards	Best Supporting Actress	Angela Lansbury (Also for All Fall Down)	Won
National Film Preservation Board	National Film Registry		Inducted
Producers Guild of America Awards	PGA Hall of Fame – Motion Pictures		Won

In 1994, The Manchurian Candidate was selected for preservation in the United States National Film Registry by the Library of Congress as being "culturally, historically, or aesthetically significant". The film ranked 67th on the "AFI's 100 Years...100 Movies" when that list was first compiled in 1998, but a 2007 revised version excluded it. It was 17th on AFI's "AFI's 100 Years...100 Thrills" lists. In April 2007, Lansbury's character was selected by Time as one of the 25 greatest villains in cinema history.

== Releases ==
A false rumor posited that Sinatra removed the film from distribution after John F. Kennedy's assassination on November 22, 1963. According to Michael Schlesinger, who was responsible for the film's 1988 reissue by MGM/UA, the film was never removed. Newspaper display ads indicate that after the assassination, The Manchurian Candidate was rereleased less frequently or widely than other 1962 movies, but it was available. The movie played at a Brooklyn cinema in January 1964, and that same month in White Plains, New York, and Jersey City, New Jersey. It was televised nationwide on the CBS Thursday Night Movie on September 16, 1965.

Sinatra's representatives acquired rights to the film in 1972 after the initial contract with United Artists expired. The film was rebroadcast on nationwide television in April 1974 on NBC Saturday Night at the Movies. After a showing at the New York Film Festival in 1987 increased public interest in the film, the studio reacquired the rights and it became again available for theater and video releases.

On March 15, 2016, The Criterion Collection issued a Blu-Ray of the film. In June 2023, Kino Lorber issued a 4K Ultra HD Blu-Ray of the film.

== See also ==
- List of American films of 1962
- List of assassinations in fiction
- List of cult films
- Conspiracy fiction
- Hypnosis in works of fiction
- Spy film
