= Pushover (film) =

1954 film by Richard Quine

- Theatrical release poster
- Directed by: Richard Quine
- Screenplay by: Roy Huggins
- Based on: The Night Watch; 1952 novel by Thomas Walsh Rafferty; 1953 novel by William S. Ballinger
- Produced by: Jules Schermer
- Starring: Fred MacMurray; Phil Carey; Kim Novak
- Cinematography: Lester White
- Edited by: Jerome Thoms
- Music by: Arthur Morton
- Color process: Black and white
- Production company: Columbia Pictures
- Distributed by: Columbia Pictures
- Release date: August 6, 1954
- Running time: 88 minutes
- Country: United States
- Language: English
- Budget: $400,000

Pushover is a 1954 American film noir crime film directed by Richard Quine, starring Fred MacMurray, Phil Carey and Kim Novak in her first credited role. The motion picture was adapted from two novels – Thomas Walsh's The Night Watch and William S. Ballinger's Rafferty – by Roy Huggins, who went on to great success creating television series, including The Fugitive, Maverick, and The Rockford Files.

== Plot ==
During a bank robbery a bank guard is shot and killed by one of the robbers, Harry Wheeler, who gets away with $250,000. Lona McLane leaves a movie theatre and walks to her car. The car will not start, and Paul Sheridan appears at her window. He cannot fix the car and takes her to a bar while a mechanic makes a repair. They spend the night—and the next three days—together.

Sheridan is actually a cop, sent undercover to befriend Lona, hoping she will lead them to her boyfriend, Wheeler. Police Lieutenant Karl Eckstrom wants Wheeler alive for questioning. Surveillance is arranged on Lona's apartment, from an apartment opposite. Among the police on duty are Sheridan, Rick McAllister, and Paddy Dolan. Eckstrom asks Sheridan to take care of Paddy. Close to retirement, he has a drinking problem and just one more reprimand will see him lose his pension.

On surveillance, McAllister watches Lona's next door neighbour, Ann Stewart, as often as he does Lona. Entering the building one day, he saves her from a man pestering her.

During Sheridan's shift, Lona leaves her apartment, and Sheridan tails her. She drives to his apartment and tells him she knows he tampered with her car deliberately and that he is a cop. Though furious at first, she soon forgives him, professing her love for him. She then tries to persuade him to kill Wheeler and get the bank money, so they can run away together. Sheridan refuses and sends her away. However, after returning to the stakeout, he arranges to meet her on the roof of the apartment building, and agrees to her plan.

The next time Lona leaves her apartment, Sheridan allows McAllister to tail her. Sheridan tries to call Paddy on his car phone but there is no reply. Leaving the apartment building, he finds Paddy has deserted his post to visit a bar. Sheridan agrees to keep the lapse a secret. As they talk, Wheeler arrives. Sheridan and Paddy lie in wait for him at the building entrance and grab him as he leaves. They take him to his car, and make him open the trunk to get the briefcase full of money. As Paddy leans in to inspect the bag, Sheridan pretends that Wheeler is trying to jump Paddy and shoots him dead.

Sheridan persuades Paddy that they should cover up Wheeler's murder, since their boss will be furious that they disobeyed instructions and did not take Wheeler alive. They bundle Wheeler into the trunk, to dump him elsewhere.

McAllister follows Lona to a bar, where she calls her apartment. Sheridan answers the phone and says nothing, according to their plan. She calls again and Sheridan tells her to come home. Miss Stewart, who is having a party next door, rings Lona's doorbell to ask for some ice. Sheridan answers the door and refuses her request.

Back at the stakeout, Eckstrom asks McAllister why the stakeout phone was not answered when he called. McAllister also mentions that Paddy had gone into the bar.

Paddy is suspicious of Sheridan's motives. Though it will mean losing his pension, Paddy insists they must go to their boss, confess what they have done, and hand in the money. While McAllister is calling the mobile phone in Paddy's car, Paddy moves to open his car door. Sheridan reaches across the front seat to stop him. Paddy pulls his pistol. During the ensuing struggle, Paddy is shot in the stomach. As he has been shot with his own gun, Sheridan manages to claim Paddy committed suicide, after realising that deserting his post would mean the loss of his pension.

Miss Stewart follows McAllister as he is investigating events in her building and mentions the man she saw in Lona's apartment when she asked for the ice. McAllister assumes that she saw Wheeler, not Sheridan, and tells this to Sheridan.

While Eckstrom and McAllister are questioning Lona, Miss Stewart takes out the garbage and bumps into Sheridan in the hall. She hurries to her apartment and calls the police. Sheridan, watching from the stakeout apartment, realises he must silence her. He abducts her from her apartment, then collects Lona (Eckstrom and McAllister have returned to the stakeout). Sheridan takes the women to Wheeler's car to get the money.

Eckstrom and McAllister are surprised Sheridan is not at the stakeout. McAllister receives the message from Miss Stewart. He finds her apartment empty. He and Eckstrom realize Sheridan is the man she saw, and that he has both women with him.

Sheridan and the women reach Wheeler's car, but a police car is parked behind it. He sends Miss Stewart across the street to retrieve the money from the trunk. As she reaches the car, McAllister, crouching behind the police car, tells her to get down when he fires. She obeys and he shoots towards the alleyway where Sheridan and Lona are hiding. Sheridan tells Lona to run, while he makes an attempt to reach Wheeler's car and make a getaway. He waits until McAllister has moved away in another direction, but another detective is waiting, and he shoots Sheridan. An ambulance is called. Lona kneels next to the dying Sheridan, until McAllister places her in the back of a patrol car. Rick takes Miss Stewart's arm, and escorts her back to her apartment.

== Cast ==
Character names are not indicated in on-screen cast credits

Actor	Role
Fred MacMurray	Paul Sheridan
Phil Carey	Rick McAllister
And Introducing; Kim Novak	Lona McLane

with Dorothy Malone	Ann Stewart
E. G. Marshall	Lieutenant Carl Eckstrom
Allen Nourse	Paddy Dolan

Uncredited (in order of appearance)
Paul Richards	Harry Wheeler
Phil Chambers	Briggs
Don C. Harvey	Detective Peters
Mel Welles	Detective
Mort Mills	Bartender

Robert Carson	Bartender
James Anderson	Berry
Dick Crockett	Mr. Crockett
Marion Ross	Mrs. Crockett
Paul Picerni	Elegant man in Ann's hallway
Robert Stevenson	Billings

== Production ==
The film was known during shooting as The Killer Wore a Badge. It was developed by producer Philip Waxman who was going to make the movie, based on a Saturday Evening Post serial by Thomas Walsh and adapted into a script by Orin Jennings and Stanley Ellin. Waxman sold the script to Columbia, and the studio assigned Jules Shermer as producer.

At Columbia the script was done by Roy Huggins. Producer Schermer later recalled Huggins:

Did not give me exactly what I wanted and I didn't like the ending. So I took some things from a previous film that I had done on the lot (1947's Framed with Glenn Ford and Janis Carter) and borrowed from that. If you ever watch the film, you will see that much of it is the same — even to the ending — with the same dialogue which also worked for Pushover. When Huggins eventually saw a rough cut of the latter he said, "You've ruined my picture” — because of what I had borrowed from Framed. Fortunately, nobody else thought so.

In November 1953 it was announced Arnold Laven would direct.

Fred MacMurray's fee was $75,000. The budget was relatively low meaning the studio had to cast an inexpensive actor, Kim Novak, as the female lead. Schermer said "Kim was not an actress when we started shooting. The face was beautiful. The body was great. She photographed sensationally. But she couldn't show any emotion. So we kept her dialogue to a minimum. When you can't act, you react — which is what we counted on."

The outdoor scenes were filmed on the streets of Burbank, California. Prominent is the old Magnolia Theater on Magnolia Street.

== Reception ==
“Kim Novak...has a role which fits her as tautly as some of the dresses...and is photogenic enough to make almost any man take a second look at her,” wrote the Chicago Tribune. “MacMurray is blunt and believable, and young Phil Carey does very well as his partner. The film has been previously produced, but it's not bad, as crime melodramas go.” An English reviewer described the film as “Reminiscent of the good old days, when one could visit the local in the expectation of seeing a story told in pictures, black and white and incisive, aiming simply to please....The intrigue is not always plausibly presented by the script; but the film is principally weakened by Fred MacMurray's passionless performance as the detective, and the inexperience of Kim Novak as the girl. Even so, the qualities of style and atmosphere are there, and ‘Pushover’ remains a better thriller than most.”

Most critics seemed to find the film's plot similar to other film noirs, with some specifically comparing it to Double Indemnity (1944). The reviewer for The New York Times commented: "Fred MacMurray is going through the motions of his Double Indemnity role in a mild facsimile." However, Kim Novak is usually singled out as a rising photogenic star. Much later, Chicago Reader film critic Jonathan Rosenbaum wrote, "An aging cop (Fred MacMurray) falls in love with a bank robber's girlfriend (Kim Novak in her first major role, and if you're as much of a pushover for her early work as I am, you can't afford to miss this)."

Critic Dennis Schwartz liked the film and wrote, "Pushover covers familiar film noir territory, but does a good job of showing how easy it is to lose control of one's life when one is so vulnerable, obsessed and emotionally weak. Novak does a fine job in her first starring role as a heartless femme fatale who does have a heart after all."

== Legacy ==
Pushover inspired Jean-Luc Godard's Breathless.
