= Jill Rainsford =

American actress (1905–1994)

Jill Rainsford (January 31, 1905–July 5, 1994), born Marguerite Rainsford and known as Billy, was an American actress, songwriter, painter and writer.

== Biography ==
Born in Brooklyn, New York, she was the second child of Henry and Julia Rainsford and from an early age aspired to a career on the stage, beginning violin and dance lessons at age 8. Her sister Doris, four years her senior, was devoted to Billy and was her nearly constant companion throughout her life. Billy was a member of New York's famous Kiddie Klub and performed with such stars as Paulette Goddard, Gene Raymond, and Arlin Riggin, the former Olympic champion. She honed her dance techniques in Rutherford High School Productions, and by 1922, at the age of 17, she had joined Pat Rooney's "Rings of Smoke" Vaudeville act portraying the "French girl" on a cross-country tour.

The tour gave her valuable Vaudeville experience, which led her to the nascent film industry and the D.W. Griffith Company in Mamaroneck, New York. She landed the role of the dancing Indian Princess in Griffith's film America (1924), and appeared in Sally of the Sawdust (1925). In addition, she worked with Griffith plotting scenes for his leading actress Carol Dempster. When the Griffith Studio closed, Billy continued her silent film career at other New York studios including: the Spitz, Pathe, Famous Players–Lasky, and Tech Art starring with Dexter McReynolds, Charley Bowers, Fatty Lehman, and Duncan Renaldo. She also did some modeling during this period, most notably for the artist Bradshaw Crandell, who painted several magazine and calendar covers of Billy, as well as, the pastel portrait in the collection.

When the film industry moved to the west coast, Billy remained in New York with her mother and her sister and began appearing in nightclub acts in many of New York's famous nightclubs including Don Dickerman's, Pirate's Den, and Country Fair Clubs in Greenwich Village. Following a brief marriage and the birth of her son Richard Rainsford, she performed on the cruise ship circuit to Havana. Wanting to spend more time with her only child, Billy began a profitable business of writing song lyrics for notable songwriters such as Arthur Gutman, Gilbert Wall, Ray Dallas, and performers such as Spivy LeVoe, Florence Herbert, Harriet Hutchins, Beth Challis, and Irène Bordoni.

Later in life, Billy went on to own a wholesale antiques shop in upstate New York, which she ran with her son and her sister. Billy and Doris then followed Richard's academic career and eventually ended up in Ohio where Billy painted miniature landscapes and wrote her unpublished autobiography 'I Was There Charlie'. Jill "Billy" Rainsford died on July 5, 1994, at the age of 89.
