= Spivy =

American actress

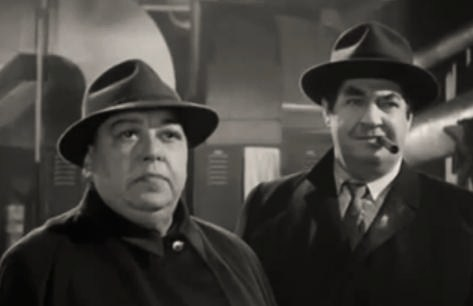
- Spivy (left) with Stanley Adams in the 1962 film Requiem for a Heavyweight
- Born: Bertha Levine; September 30, 1906; Brooklyn, New York, U.S.
- Died: January 7, 1971 (aged 64); Los Angeles, California, U.S.
- Other names: Spivy Levoe, Spivy Le Voe, Madame Spivy
- Occupations: Entertainer, actress

Bertha Levine (September 30, 1906 – January 7, 1971), (Note: Most sources, including the New York Birth Index, support the 1906 birth year, although a few state 1907. The California Death Index records her date of death as Thursday, January 7, 1971. Some sources, including Gavin (2006) and her New York Times obituary, state she died January 8.) who used the stage name Spivy (/ˈspɪvi/ SPIH-vee), was an American entertainer, nightclub owner, and actress.

== Biography ==
=== Early life ===
Bertha Levine was born in Brooklyn, New York, in 1906, the eldest of the four daughters of Louis and Helen Levine, Jewish immigrants from Russia. She played organ in churches and theaters before establishing a career as a singer-pianist in speakeasies and nightclubs under the name Spivy Le Voe, which she later shortened to Spivy. Her stage name was reportedly based on a younger sister's mispronunciation of the word "sister."

=== Performing career ===
In 1936 she became a regular act at Tony's, a New York nightclub on West 52nd Street, where she performed satirical songs, some of which were written by John LaTouche, Charlotte Kent and Jill Rainsford. In 1939, the New York Times wrote that "Spivy's material, witty, acid, and tragicomic, is better than most of the essays one hears about town, and her delivery is that of a sophisticated artist on her own grounds. She knows the value of surprise in punching a line, she uses understatement unerringly, and her piano accompaniment is superb."

From 1940–1951 she ran her own nightclub, Spivy's Roof, on the top floor of 139 East 57th Street. The club was noted for its tolerance of gay performers and patrons; Spivy herself was a lesbian in private life. Among the artists who performed there were The Revuers (which consisted of Judy Holliday, Betty Comden and Adolph Green), Frances Faye, Mabel Mercer, Moms Mabley, Alberta Hunter, Thelma Carpenter, Martha Raye, Bea Arthur, Arthur Blake, Rae Bourbon, Liberace, and actor-magician Fred Keating. Although it was reported that Spivy and Keating intended to marry on Christmas Eve 1942, this appears to have been a publicity stunt or lavender marriage.

She released two 78 rpm albums of songs that she regularly performed in her live sets, including "The Tarantella" and "The Alley Cat". These 13 recordings have never been reissued on CD. Her recordings indicate that her performing style was to "recite" (rather than sing) the lyrics over piano accompaniment. In 1951, Paul Lynde was appearing at Spivy's Roof when the club closed. He later talked about Spivy and her club on the April 30, 1976 episode of Johnny Carson's Tonight Show.

=== Later acting career ===
In the 1950s, Spivy spent several years touring Paris, London, and Rome before returning to the U.S. in 1957, where she embarked on a new career as a character actor, usually billed as Madame Spivy. In 1957–58, she appeared as Mother Burnside in the Broadway production of Auntie Mame.

Spivy had supporting roles in the films The Fugitive Kind, Studs Lonigan, All Fall Down, Requiem for a Heavyweight, and The Manchurian Candidate, where her stout physique led to her being cast as matronly or villainous characters. (Note: Gavin (2006) states she also appeared in 1962's Walk on the Wild Side, but this is not corroborated by other sources.) Her best-remembered television appearance is a darkly humorous installment of Alfred Hitchcock Presents, the 1959 episode "Specialty of the House" in which she played the manager of a restaurant whose unsuspecting guests implicitly end up on the menu.

=== Death ===
By 1969, Spivy had been diagnosed with cancer. Her friend Patsy Kelly arranged for her to move into the Motion Picture Country Home in Woodland Hills, Los Angeles, where she died on January 7, 1971, aged 64.

== Discography ==
- Seven Gay Sophisticated Songs by Spivy (1939)
- An Evening with Spivy (1947)

== Filmography ==
| Year | Title | Role | Notes |
|---|---|---|---|
| 1960 | The Fugitive Kind | Ruby Lightfoot | |
| 1960 | Studs Lonigan | Mother Josephine | |
| 1962 | All Fall Down | Bouncer | |
| 1962 | Requiem for a Heavyweight | Ma Greeny | |
| 1962 | The Manchurian Candidate | Female Berezovo | |

== Selected television appearances ==
| Year | Series | Episode | Role | Notes |
|---|---|---|---|---|
| 1959 | Alfred Hitchcock Presents | Season 5 Episode 12: "Specialty of the House" | Spirro | |
| 1960 | Peter Gunn | Dream Big, Dream Deadly | Flo | |
| 1967 | Daniel Boone | A Matter of Blood | Tatama | |
