= Bill S. Ballinger =

American writer

See Bill Ballinger for Canadian politician

William Sanborn Ballinger (1912–1980) was an American writer and screenwriter.

== Early life ==
He was born 13 March 1912 in Oskalloosa, Iowa. He received his education at the University of Wisconsin, receiving a B.A. in 1934, and earned an LL.D. from Northern College, Philippines in 1940.

== Career ==
Working in radio and advertising in the early 1940s, Ballinger wrote 81 radio scripts and produced The Dinah Shore Show, The Breakfast Club, and Lowell Thomas broadcasts. After Ballinger moved from New York to Los Angeles, he began writing full-time.

Writing primarily under his own name, but occasionally using the pen names B.X. Sanborn and Frederic Freyer, Ballinger authored almost 30 books and twenty-five short stories. His mysteries sold more than ten million copies in the U.S., and have been reprinted in thirty countries and translated into more than thirteen languages. The hardboiled private-detective novel The Body in the Bed marked his debut in 1948, and he followed this with the sequel The Body Beautiful, the following year.

Best known as a writer of suspense novels, he achieved international fame as an early exponent of dual narrative storytelling, employing first and third person narration and two stories in tandem that converge to produce an unexpected ending. His most famous work, Portrait in Smoke, published in 1950, received a Les Grands Maîtres du Roman Policier Award and was filmed in 1956 as Wicked as they Come. Subsequent split-narration novels, including the internationally bestselling The Tooth and the Nail, The Longest Second, which was nominated for an Edgar Award for Best Mystery novel in 1958, The Wife of the Red-Haired Man, and Not I, Said the Vixen, brought him further success. Ballinger's two main fictional characters in his novels were Chicago private investigator Barr Breed and Native American Central Intelligence Agency Agent Joaquin Hawke.

Between 1977 and 1979 he was an associate professor of writing at the California State University Northridge, Los Angeles, California.

== Later life ==
Ballinger died 23 March 1980 Tarzana, California.

== Screenwriting ==
Ballinger was a frequent writer for American television with 150 teleplays to his name. These included seven teleplays for Alfred Hitchcock Presents (one of which, "The Day of the Bullet," based on a short story by Stanley Ellin, won him an Edgar for Best Half-Hour Teleplay in 1961), two episodes of Kolchak: The Night Stalker, several police television shows such as Tightrope and Ironside and the episode "The Mice" for The Outer Limits.

In addition to his books and teleplays, Ballinger wrote screenplays for Burt Topper's The Strangler (1963) and Operation CIA (1965), a Burt Reynolds spy film set in Vietnam but filmed in Thailand.

== Barr Breed series ==
- The Body in the Bed (New York, Harper, 1948)
- The Body Beautiful (New York, Harper, 1949)

== Joaquin Hawks series ==
- The Spy in the Jungle (New York, New American Library, 1965)
- The Chinese Mask (New York, New American Library, 1965)
- The Spy in Bangkok (New York, New American Library, 1965)
- The Spy at Angor Wat (New York, New American Library, 1966)
- The Spy in the Java Sea (New York, New American Library, 1966)

== Non series novels ==
- Portrait in Smoke (New York, Harper, 1950)
- The Darkening Door (New York, Harper, 1952)
- Rafferty (New York, Harper, 1953)
- The Tooth and the Nail (New York, Harper, 1955)
- The Black Black Hearse (New York, St. Martin's Press, 1955) - as Frederic Freyer
- The Longest Second (New York, Harper, 1957)
- The Wife of the Red-Haired Man (New York, Harper, 1957)
- Beacon in the Night (New York, Harper, 1958)
- Formula For Murder (New York, New American Library, 1958)
- The Doom Maker (New York, Dutton, 1959) - as B.X. Sanborn.
- The Fourth Forever (New York, Harper, 1963)
- Not I Said the Vixen (New York, Fawcett, 1965)
- The Heir Hunters (New York, Harper, 1966)
- The Source of Fear (New York, New American Library, 1968)
- The 49 Days of Death (Los Angeles, Sherbourne Press, 1969)
- Heist Me Higher (New York, New American Library, 1969)
- The Lopsided Man (Los Angeles, Pyramid, 1969)
- The Corsican (New York, Dodd Mead, 1974)
- The Law (New York, Warner, 1975), novelisation
- The Ultimate Warrior (New York, Warner, 1975)
- Lost City of Stone (New York, Simon & Schuster, 1978)

== Filmography ==
=== Films ===
Year	Film	Credit	Notes
1954	Pushover	Story By	Based on the novel "Rafferty"
1956	Wicked as They Come	Story By	Based on the novel "Portrait in Smoke"
1960	Unsolved	Written By	Television Movie
1964	The Strangler	Written By	
1965	Operation C.I.A.	Written By	Co-Wrote screenplay with "Peer J. Oppenheimer"
1980	Die längste Sekunde	Story By	Television Movie, Based on the novel "The Longest Second"
2017	The Tooth and the Nail	Story By	Based on The novel of the same name

=== Television ===
Year	TV Series	Credit	Notes
1949	Mr. Black	Writer	1 Episode
1950	The Philco Television Playhouse	Writer	1 Episode
1958–59	M Squad	Writer	2 Episodes
1959	Mike Hammer	Writer	11 Episodes
1959	Shotgun Slade	Writer	1 Episode
1959–61	Alfred Hitchcock Presents	Writer	7 Episodes
1960	Bonanza	Writer	1 Episode
1960	Diagnosis: Unknown	Writer	1 Episode
1960	The Man from Blackhawk	Writer	1 Episode
1960	Tales of Wells Fargo	Writer	2 Episodes
1960	Tightrope!	Writer	1 Episode
1961	The Aquanauts	Writer	1 Episode
1961	Miami Undercover	Writer	1 Episode
1961	Tallahassee 7000	Writer	2 Episodes
1963	Arrest and Trial	Writer	1 Episode
1964	The Outer Limits	Writer	1 Episode
1966	I Spy	Writer	1 Episode
1967	Run For Your Life	Writer	1 Episode
1968–72	Ironside	Writer	3 Episodes
1972–73	Cannon	Writer	2 Episodes
1973	Circle Of Fear	Writer	1 Episode
1974–75	Kolchak: The Night Stalker	Writer	2 Episodes
