= Tales of Malamud =

Two, one-act operas by Marc Blitzstein

Tales of Malamud is the name of two, one-act operas by Marc Blitzstein based on two stories by American writer Bernard Malamud. Namely, “Idiots First” and “The Magic Barrel.” At the time of his death in 1964, Blitzen had yet to formally finish both of the operas. The project was completed by American composer Leonard Lehrman and subsequently premiered in March 1977 in Bloomington, Indiana.

== History ==
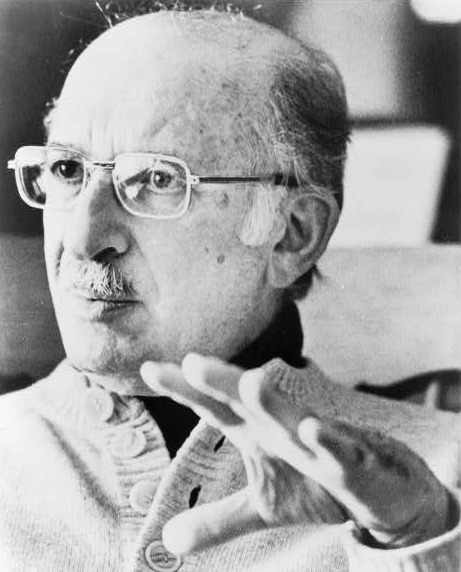
Portrait of Bernard Malamud

The work began in the fall of 1962 after Blitzstein accepted a playwright-in-residence at Bennington College in Vermont. There, he became the friend of Bernard Malamud and shortly thereafter, began working on adapting two stories by Malamud into operas. However, he had previously imagined three not two, the other story not yet decided among many choices. The three stories were going to form three acts into one opera.

On January 1, 1963, a contract was signed by Malamud giving Blitzstein full rights over the stories. Inspired by his travels to Israel, Blitzstein was interested in bringing the Jewish experience to the operatic stage in-line with other projects at the time like Fiddler on the Roof. On April 19, 1964, Leonard Bernstein had led an orchestra during a memorial concert to Blitzstein when he announced his plan to finish "Idiots First." However, this never occurred nor did the estate's request for William Bolcom to take on the task. However, Leonard Lehrman was eager to do it and in 1970, the Blitzstein estate gave him permission.

=== Idiots First ===
Blitzen began with "Idiots First" in 1961, quickly finishing the draft by 1963 although continuing to edit until his death the following year. The first of the operas was going to be 13 scenes, with eight singers, two speaking roles, and five silent actors. The opera was to dramatically follow a similar plot to his opera, Reuben, Reuben. The score only survives in pieces, scenes one through seven and scene nine archived with the others in sketched form or presumed lost.

Lehrman's two-piano version premiered on August 3, 1974, performed by the Marc Blitzstein Opera Company as founded by Lehrman. It was well regarded by the press and public alike.

=== The Magic Barrel ===
The second of the two operas was begun roughly around the same time, although the libretto was in its first draft by 1963. The opera takes a more inward look rather than relying on external action and has six scenes as opposed to the former 13. Only the music of the first scene and a singular song remain of the score to this day. The opera was not full enough to be able to reconstructed by Lehrman due to the missing parts and sketches.

== Literature ==
- Jeremy B. Blackwood, Under The Influence Of Marc Blitzstein: Examining Leonard J. Lehrman's Uses Of Serial Techniques For Dramatic Purposes In Karla (2010. Dissertation, University of North Texas)
