= Enzo Stuarti =

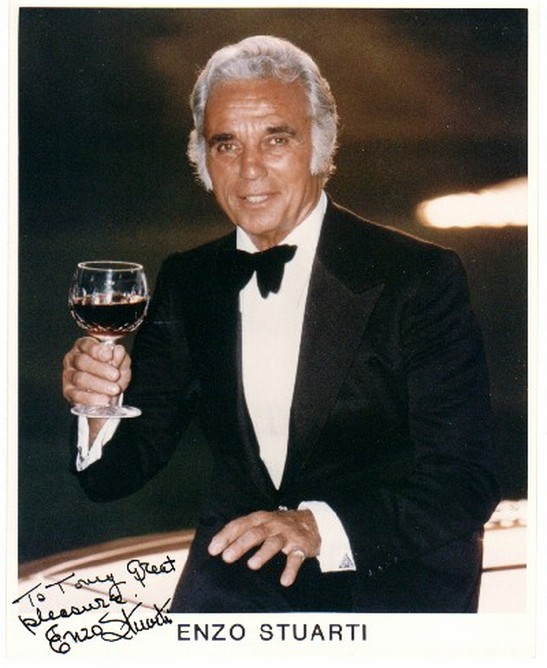
- Enzo Stuarti publicity photo (circa 2000)

Background information
- Also known as: Larry Laurence, Larry Stuart
- Born: Lorenzo Scapone; March 3, 1919; Rome, Kingdom of Italy
- Died: December 16, 2005 (aged 86) Midland, Texas, U.S.
- Years active: 1945–2004
- Labels: Jubilee, Epic, Columbia, Roulette, Diplomat, Spin-O-Rama

Enzo Stuarti (born Lorenzo Scapone; March 3, 1919 – December 16, 2005) was an Italian American tenor and musical theater performer. After performing on Broadway under the stage names Larry Laurence and Larry Stuart, he changed his name again and began a recording career in which he released several successful albums. He made regular stage and television appearances, and was featured in commercials for Ragú spaghetti sauce.

== Early life ==
Enzo Stuarti was born Lorenzo Scapone in Rome, Italy. His parents fled Italy for the United States when Benito Mussolini came to power; but he was left behind with an aunt who placed him in the Monte Cassino Abbey, where he was raised by monks. He joined his family in Newark, New Jersey in 1934, where he finished school and worked with his father, a baker by trade.

In 1940, Stuarti joined the United States Merchant Marine and was assigned aboard the Liberty ship SS Charles Pratt, a Panamanian-based tanker. On December 21, 1940, the ship was torpedoed by a German U-boat. He survived the attack and after his service in the Merchant Marine, he returned to Italy for voice training in order to pursue his ambition of singing professionally. He studied for a time at the Accademia di Santa Cecilia in Rome.

== Broadway career ==
Stuarti's Broadway debut was Hollywood Pinafore followed by Nellie Bly. Then in 1946, he was cast in the role of Passepartout in the Cole Porter – Orson Welles musical Around the World. The production was not considered a success; it closed after 75 performances. Additional Broadway credits included As the Girls Go, Two on the Aisle, Me and Juliet, and By the Beautiful Sea. During this time he was performing under the stage names "Larry Laurence" (sometimes spelled "Lawrence") and "Larry Stuart". In 1955, he performed under the name Enzo Stuarti in the Marc Blitzstein folk opera Reuben, Reuben.

== Recording career ==
Toward the end of 1954, he took the name "Enzo Stuarti" at the suggestion of Ed Sullivan, who thought he should have a more Italian-sounding name. He began reworking his voice and focusing on a career as a semi-classical vocalist. His first big break came when Jubilee Records signed him in 1960. Stuarti's debut album, We're Not Strangers (JPL 1041) enjoyed moderate success, but it was a last-minute engagement at the Plaza Hotel's Persian Room that began to get the singer noticed. The press response was favorable and this prompted Jubilee to try a two-faceted promotion push. First came his second album, Enzo Stuarti at the Plaza (JLP 5022) followed by presenting the singer in an arranged promotional concert at Carnegie Hall, which was recorded and later released as a two-record set, Enzo Stuarti Arrives at Carnegie Hall (JGM2-5055). Well recorded and well produced, the album helped to establish Stuarti's standing as a vocalist and night club performer, and he considered the performance to be one of the high points of his career. Next came a tribute album to the late tenor Mario Lanza, with whom Stuarti was sometimes compared. This album was repeatedly re-released on several different labels under various titles. Where Mario Lanza was a genuine operatic artist though, Enzo Stuarti was vocally most comfortable with the popular, semi-classical repertoire, supported with vocal amplification.

He released over 30 recordings for several labels, including Jubilee, Epic, Columbia, Roulette, Diplomat, and Spin-O-Rama. During the 1960s and into the early 1970s, he was a frequent guest on televisions shows such as The Tonight Show and appeared in a series of commercials for Ragú spaghetti sauce, where his catchphrase was "That's A'Nice!" He played major venues in Los Angeles, Las Vegas, New York City, and Atlantic City. He also performed at events such as Italian-American festivals. In 1982, he performed at a Blessing ceremony of the Unification Church presided over by Sun Myung Moon and his wife Hak Ja Han.

Critical opinions of Stuarti's voice and music were mixed. A writer for The Washington Post called his voice "rich in bravura and overpowering in its fullness". Time described his voice as one of "cocktails-and-dancing dimensions," but said "he makes the most of it" with the help of electronic amplification. Other critics complained that he was overly loud, with one writer saying "he concentrated on volume to the exclusion of style".

== Personal life ==
While studying in Rome, he responded to an advertisement by Ferrari race cars for test drivers. He needed the income and applied, driving professionally for a brief period. He developed a passion for cars, eventually owning several hundred.

Stuarti married twice. In 1942 he married Esther Mesce, with whom he had two children. They divorced in 1972. He married Thelma Donohoo in 1975. He retired in 2004, and died December 16, 2005, in Midland, Texas.
