= Comedy Theatre (New York City) =

Former theatre in Manhattan, New York

- Collier's Comedy Theatre (1910–13); Mercury Theatre (1937–40); Artef Theatre (1940–42)
- Interactive map of Comedy Theatre
- Address: 108 West 41st Street; New York City; United States
- Coordinates: 40.7543717°N 73.9853195°W
- Owner: The Shubert Organization
- Capacity: 687
- Type: Broadway

Construction
- Opened: September 6, 1909
- Demolished: 1942
- Years active: 1909–1942
- Architect: D. G. Malcolm

The Comedy Theatre was a Broadway theatre located at 108 West 41st Street in Manhattan that opened in 1909. It presented the first Broadway appearances of Katharine Cornell and Ruth Draper, as well as Eugene O'Neill's first Broadway play. Shuttered in the wake of the Depression, it reopened in 1937 as the Mercury Theatre – the venue for Orson Welles's groundbreaking adaptation of Shakespeare's Julius Caesar and other productions for the Mercury Theatre repertory company. In 1939 it began presenting classic Yiddish theatre. The building was demolished in 1942.

== History ==
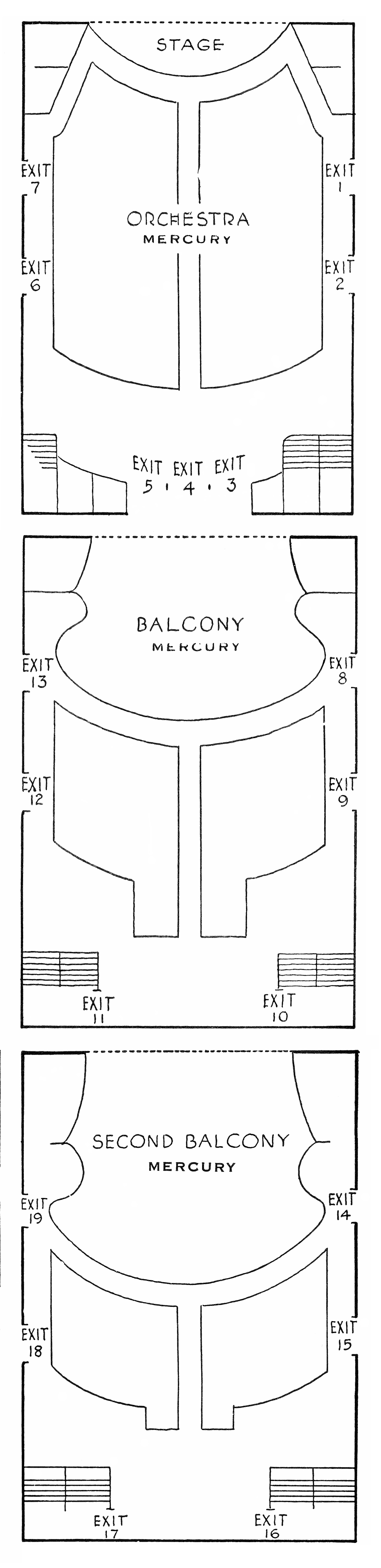
Mercury Theatre seating plan from the playbill for Heartbreak House (1938)

Architect D. G. Malcolm designed the Comedy Theatre, a Broadway theatre located at 108 West 41st Street in Manhattan, for The Shubert Organization. Its first production, The Melting Pot, opened September 6, 1909. The 687-seat theatre was a venue for more intimate productions, and was often leased to producers including William Collier, Cecil B. DeMille, and the Washington Square Players. Katharine Cornell made her first Broadway appearance at the Comedy Theatre, and Ruth Draper also made her debut there. Eugene O'Neill's first Broadway play, In the Zone, opened at the Comedy Theatre in 1917. With its narrow orchestra pit and a booth for follow spots at the rear of the second balcony, the theatre was also used for small musical shows.

The Comedy Theatre was shuttered in 1931, in the aftermath of the Wall Street crash of 1929. It reopened in 1937 as the Mercury Theatre, leased by John Houseman and Orson Welles for their new repertory theatre company, the Mercury Theatre. Houseman later described the venue as "an intimate, rococo, two-balcony theatre [that] was for many years one of Manhattan's most elegant smaller playhouses."

The Mercury company was able to lease the Comedy Theatre for three years at $187.50 a week. The intermediary for the owner, reputedly a Chicago gangster, said that the owner would not pay a cent for any repairs or maintenance, but he did not care what was done to the building as long as the first three months' rent was paid in advance. When the Mercury took over the theatre, production manager Jean Rosenthal presented Houseman with "a formidable list of absolute and immediate necessities, which included major repairs to the grid, new rigging and power lines and a new stage floor to replace the rotting planks through which huge, fearless rodents could be seen emerging on their hunting excursions." The repairs, which also included cleaning the rusty, grimy exterior, had to be made within a month. At the end of October 1937, press agent Henry Senber oversaw a ceremony unveiling the new electric sign identifying the theatre as the Mercury. Ticket prices ranged from 55 cents, for seats in the top balcony, to $2.20 for front row orchestra seats.

It was the venue for most of the Mercury's productions from November 1937 to November 1938. The first was Caesar, Welles's modern-dress adaptation of William Shakespeare's Julius Caesar, streamlined into a critically acclaimed anti-fascist tour de force. Its last production there was Danton's Death (1938). The Mercury Theatre productions are regarded as the greatest successes of the venue's history.

In June 1939 the theatre began its final transition when Welles and Houseman leased the Mercury Theatre to the newly formed Dramatic Art Theatrical Association and the Artef Players, a well-known Yiddish theatre company. The facility operated as the Artef Theatre from 1940 until its demolition in 1942.

The site is now occupied by an office building. In 2009 a plaque was dedicated there to mark the location of the historic Mercury Theatre.

== Notable productions ==
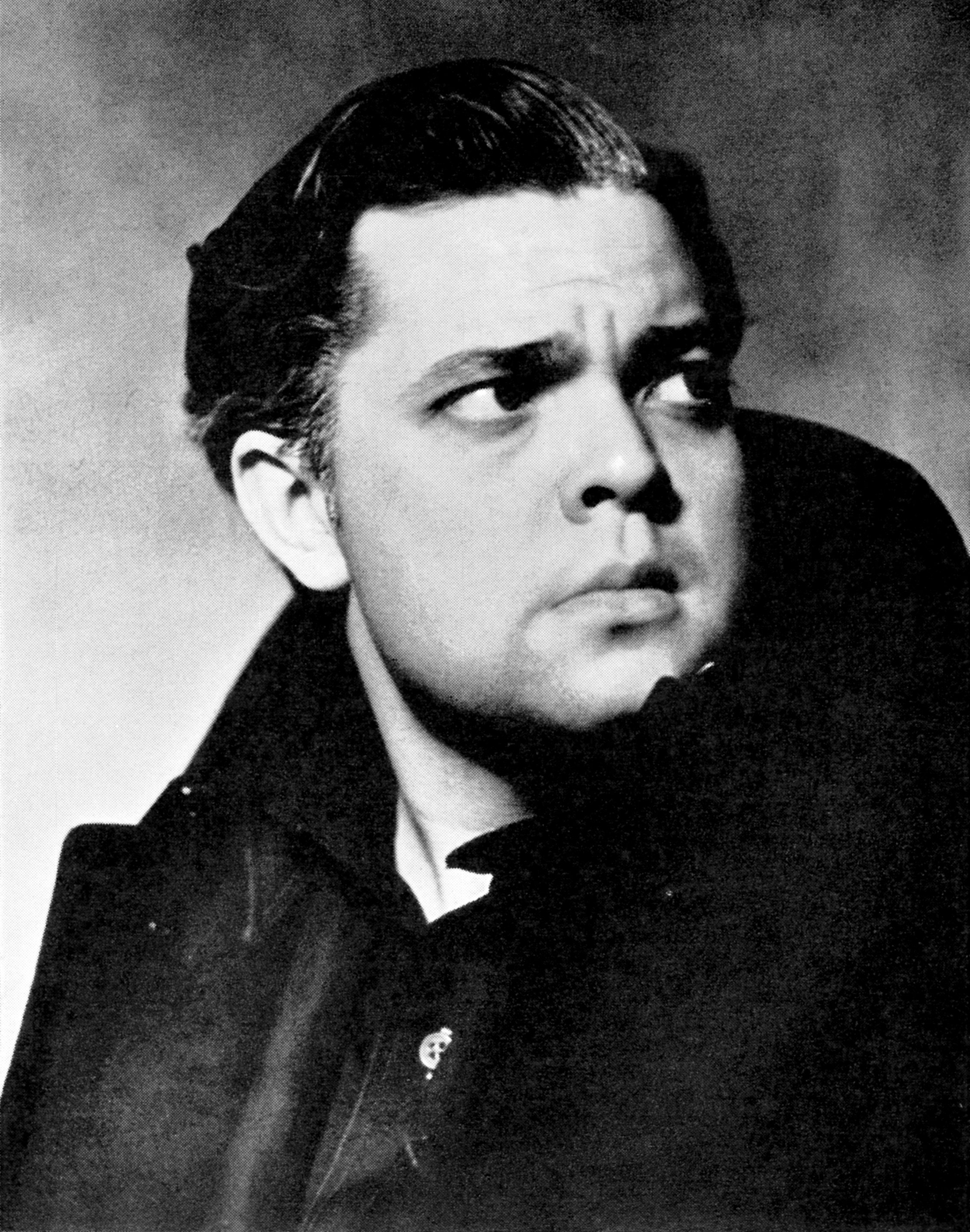
Orson Welles as Brutus in Caesar

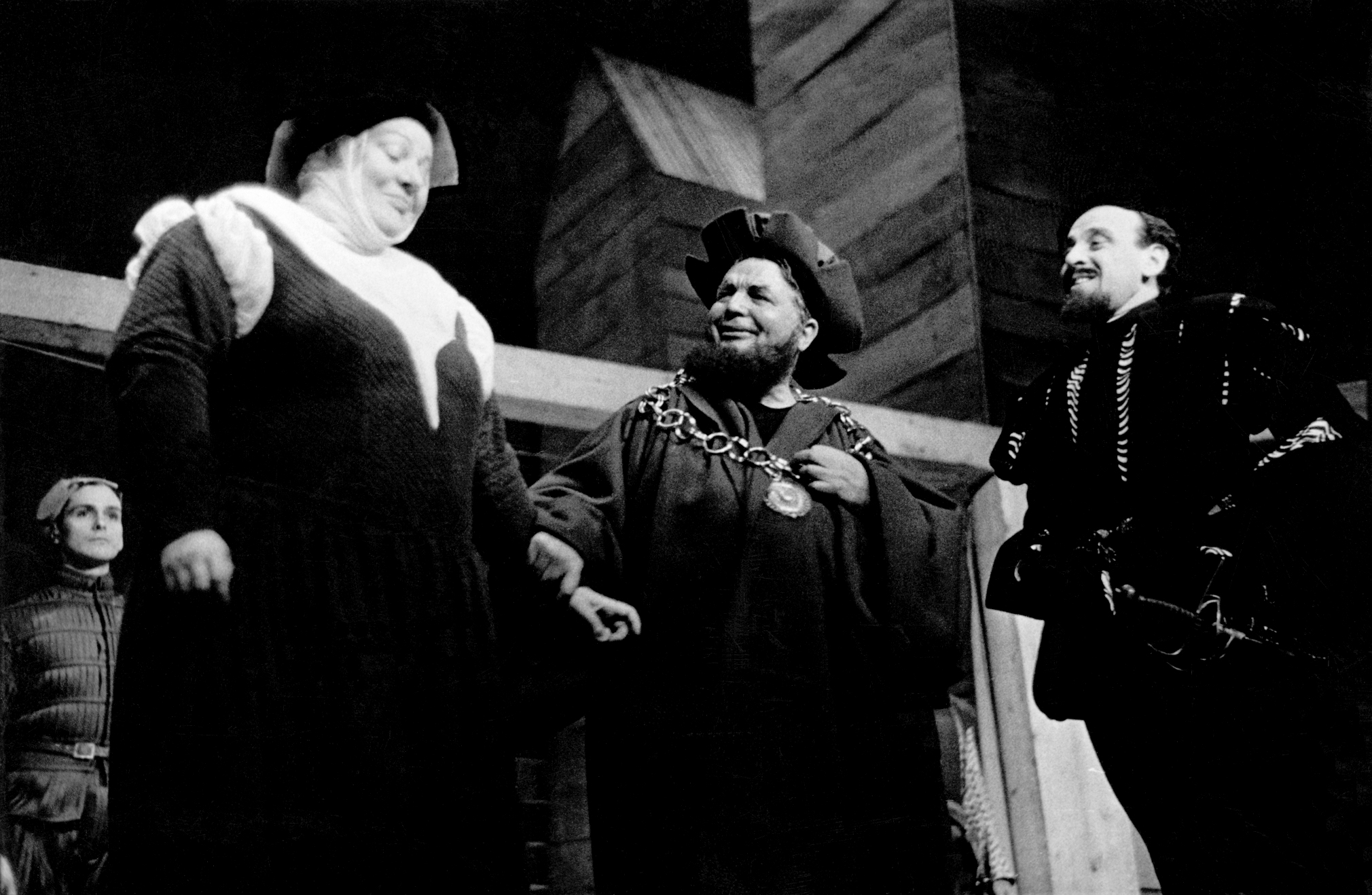
Marian Warring-Manley, Whitford Kane and George Coulouris in The Shoemaker's Holiday

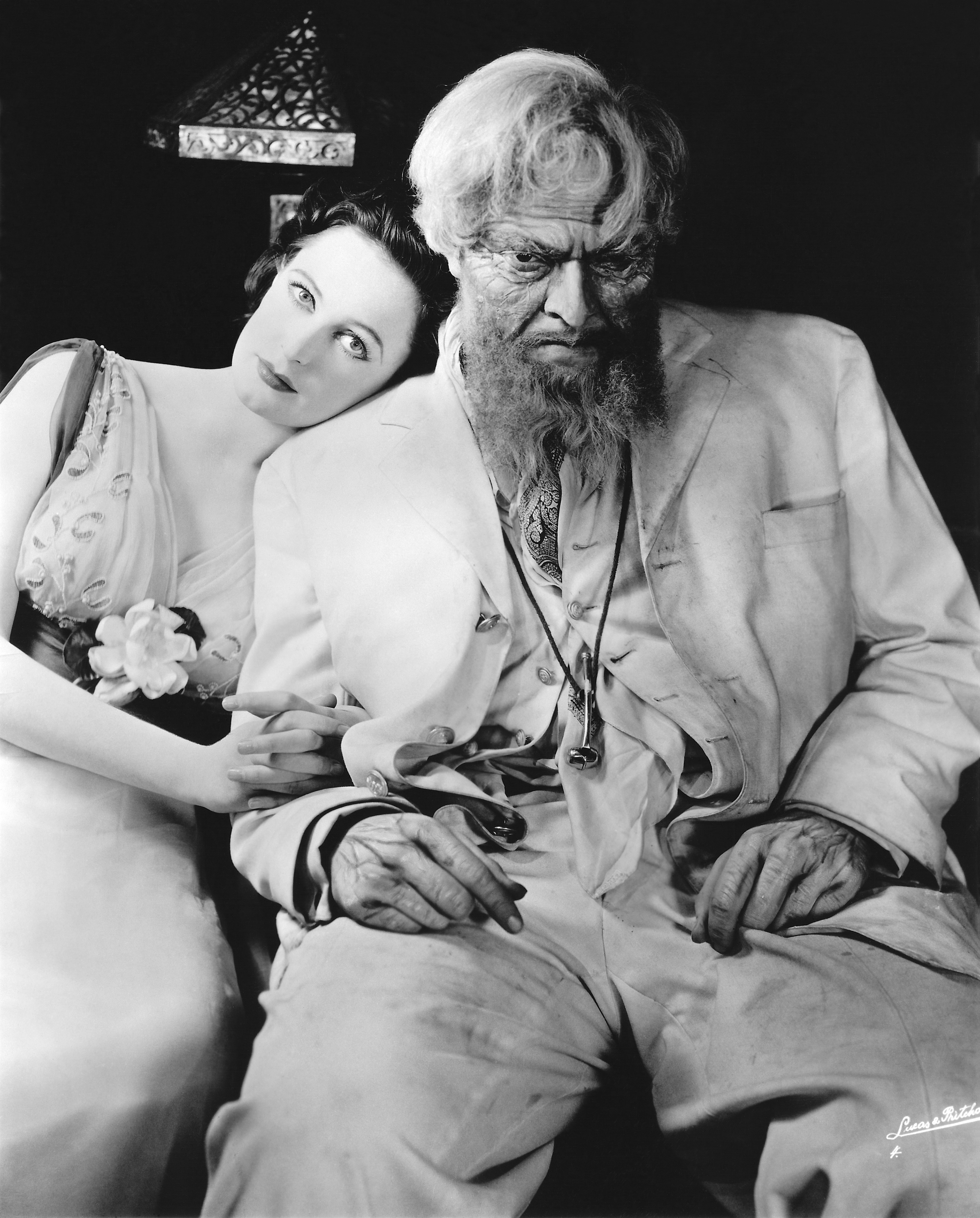
Geraldine Fitzgerald and Orson Welles in Heartbreak House

=== Comedy Theatre ===
- Penelope (1909)
- The Affinity (1910)
- A Man's World (1910)
- The Three Daughters of Monsieur Dupont (1910)
- The Family (1910)
- Her Own Money (1913)
- In the Zone (1917–18)

=== Collier's Comedy Theatre ===
- I'll Be Hanged If I Do (1910)
- Bunty Pulls the Strings (1911)
- Fanny's First Play (1912–13)

=== Mercury Theatre ===
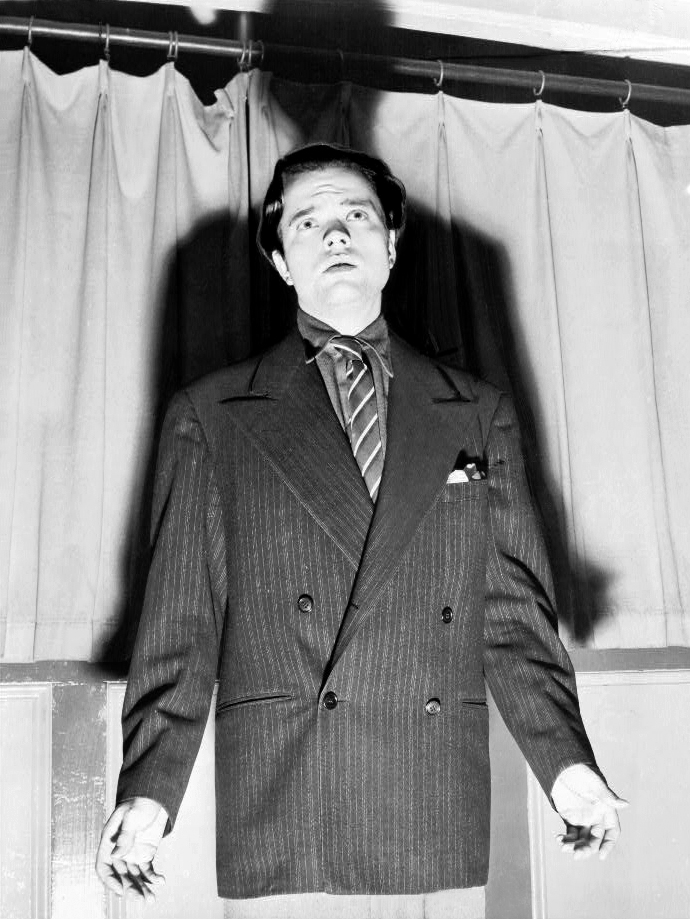
After "The War of the Worlds" radio broadcast, photographers lay in wait for Welles at the all-night rehearsal for Danton's Death at the Mercury Theatre (October 31, 1938)

- Caesar (1937)
- The Cradle Will Rock (1937, Worklight Theatre presentation)
- The Shoemaker's Holiday (1938)
- Dear Abigail by David Howard (1938, Worklight Theatre presentation)
- I've Got the Tune and Ben Bengal's Plant in the Sun (1938, Worklight Theatre presentation)
- Heartbreak House (1938)
- Danton's Death (1938)

=== Artef Players at the Mercury Theatre ===
- Clinton Street (opening October 12, 1939; Artef Players leasing the venue still named the Mercury Theatre)
- Uriel Acosta (December 29, 1939 – February 18, 1940; Artef Players leasing the venue still named the Mercury Theatre)

== Cultural references ==
Richard Linklater's 2008 film, Me and Orson Welles, is a romantic comedy set during the days before the opening of Caesar at the Mercury Theatre. "Like most Welles stage shows, alas, this one left few traces," wrote Wall Street Journal drama critic Terry Teachout. "No part of the production was filmed, and nothing else survives but the design sketches and some still photographs taken in 1937. … What makes Me and Orson Welles uniquely interesting to scholars of American drama is that Mr. Linklater's design team found the Gaiety Theatre on the Isle of Man. This house closely resembles the old Comedy Theatre on 41st Street, which was torn down five years after Julius Caesar opened there. Using Samuel Leve's original designs, they reconstructed the set for Julius Caesar on the Gaiety's stage. Then Mr. Linklater filmed some 15 minutes' worth of scenes from the play, lit according to Jean Rosenthal's plot, accompanied by Marc Blitzstein's original incidental music and staged in a style as close to that of the 1937 production as is now possible." Teachout wrote that he "was floored by the verisimilitude of the results".
