= I've Got the Tune =

Radio opera by Marc Blitzstein

I've Got The Tune
- Radio opera by Marc Blitzstein
- Librettist: Marc Blitzstein
- Language: English
- Premiere: October 24, 1937; Broadcast on WABC from Manhattan, New York

I've Got the Tune is an American radio opera with words and music by Marc Blitzstein. Dedicated to Orson Welles, it was commissioned by CBS Radio for its experimental series, the Columbia Workshop. Its first performance was broadcast October 24, 1937, with a cast that included the composer, Shirley Booth, Lotte Lenya and Norman Lloyd. The performance was conducted by Bernard Herrmann.

== Background ==
Irving Reis had worked with Marc Blitzstein on the 1937 film The Spanish Earth. As Reis was the founder of the Columbia Workshop, it is probably through their collaborative work on the film that they became acquainted with one another, and how the CBS commission came about. A contract was drawn up, dated August 12, 1937, requesting a "musical dramatic work … suitable for radio broadcasting" and specifying limits on the number of performers. Blitzstein wrote for seven principal players and an orchestra of twenty-four.

The work was dedicated to Orson Welles, who was to have played the role of the composer, Mr. Musiker, in the CBS Radio premiere. Blitzstein took over the part himself when Welles was consumed with rehearsals for the Mercury Theatre's debut stage production, Caesar.

Along with The Cradle Will Rock and his subsequent work, No For an Answer, I've Got the Tune represents a kind of lyric theatre that grew out of European and American traditions of the 1920s and came into its own by the mid-1930s. The resulting works were "unique amalgams of [Blitzstein's] own twentieth-century idiom with the adopted techniques clearly within the strict proletarian precepts he had formulated under the guidance of social concepts taught and practiced by Hanns Eisler, along with Bertolt Brecht and Kurt Weill."

== Synopsis ==
=== Scene 1 ===
Walking up Broadway. Mr. Musiker introduces himself as a composer with a tune lacking a text. He is in search of a secretary to help find a text. He interviews Beetzie, a stenographer, while they both walk up Broadway ("Beetzie is my name"). Musiker explains his task of trying to find the right words to fit the tune, singing it to Beetzie ("Every measure note for note"). Although Beetzie finds Musiker's tune "screwy" she takes the job.

=== Scene 2 ===
Madame Arbutus's apartment. Musiker and Beetzie visit Madame Arbutus from Stuttgart, a "priestess of the new music, the new poetry, the new art." She describes her creative process ("On scotch and art"). Musiker tries to play his melody for he but she interrupts, extemporizing her version of the tune ("The moon is a happy cheese tonight"). Upon exclaiming ""Ah! it is so grand to be so bored! You can afford the kind of music you cannot stand," Beetzie says to Musiker "Let's get out of here!"

=== Scene 3 ===
A scene in a wood. Beetzie and Musiker hide behind a bush as they watch Captain Bristlepunkt and his followers, the Purple Shirties, induct Private Aloysius Schnook as a new recruit. The Purple Shirties sing their version of Musiker's tune ("How peaceful is our captain!"). The induction ceremony begins as Schnook reveals he joined only to retain his business clients. Captain Bristlepunkt urges Schnook to vow death to the mongrels who "run the stores and banks in ev’ry town", whips Schnook, and then has Schnook whip himself. Horrified by the scene, Beetzie and Musiker run away.

=== Scene 4 ===
An apartment building. While relaxing on a building's roof, Musiker prevents a Suicide from killing herself ("And so, the last thing too"). She sings her own version of Musiker's tune ("There is a girl I know") before fleeing Musiker's grasp as she leaps off the roof.

=== Scene 5 ===
Beetzie and Musiker recount the transformations of the tune indicative of the places they have been around the world: A Chinese lullaby, an Italian organ-grinder waltz, a Tin Pan Alley song ("The Hangover Blues"), and an African war dance. They then encounter a group of high school students celebrating Field Day, singing leftist songs such as "Pie in the Sky," "Hold the Fort" and "Solidarity Forever." The children immediately adapt Musiker's tune ("Because this is our day"). Excited, Musiker proclaims "Here's where my tune belongs!" He offers to give it to the group, but a high schooler responds "Mister, you can't—it's ours already." The group then sings the tune complete with the words "Because this is our day! We’re singing songs of May! That’s why we sing today! Because we’ll rule tomorrow, we can sing today!"

== Sources and plot analysis ==
In I've Got the Tune Blitzstein explores the composer's role in society. The message he apparently wanted to convey was that an artist can overcome isolation by serving the people. It also dealt with a serious socially-relevant theme that Blitzstein considered to be necessary for a significant twentieth-century work.

Blitzstein's sketches shed light on the sources for inspiration and his original intentions. The idea of a journeying idealist accompanied by a practical-minded sidekick could have based on Miguel de Cervantes's Don Quixote, which is mentioned several times in Blitzstein's previous project The Spanish Earth. Earlier drafts have Beetzie's name as "Gracie" — an indication that at one point Blitzstein modeled the secretary on Gracie Allen, a parallel apparent in Shirley Booth's delivery with a similar voice.

Blitzstein originally thought of a tango for the salon scene led by "Mrs. Plush." This was to be a parody of Josephine Porter Boardman Crane, for whom Blitzstein once performed "The Rich" from The Cradle Will Rock, only to be met with incomprehension by Crane. Captain Bristlepunkt and the Purple Shirties are an amalgam of the Nazi brown shirts and the Italian fascist black shirts. Bristlepunkt is clearly a mixture of Hitler and Mussolini. The sketches are more explicit in articulating Antisemitism by references (later deleted) to the "Lewish race."

At one point he considered a male part for The Suicide, not wanting to draw attention to his wife's death from anorexia the previous year. In early drafts Blitzstein had planned an additional scene in Tin Pan Alley, at the office of Finaigler, Kibitz and McGuire, who would have already adapted the tune. ("The Hangover Blues" is a vestige of this discarded scene.) Rather than a "Field Day," Blitzstein had intended the final scene to take place on May Day with the high school children assembling at Union Square in Manhattan, a known location for political activism and communist rallies.

== Productions ==
Role	Voice type	Premiere Cast, October 24, 1937 Conductor: Bernard Herrmann	First staged production; Blitzstein playing the piano, February 6, 1938
Musiker	speaking role	Marc Blitzstein	Marc Blitzstein
Beetzie	Mezzo-soprano	Shirley Booth	Peggy Coudray
Madame Arbutus	Soprano	Adelaide Klein	Adelaide Klein
Captain Bristlepunkt		Kenny Delmar	Kenny Delmar
Private Aloysius Schnook	Tenor	Norman Lloyd	Norman Lloyd
The Suicide	Soprano	Lotte Lenya	Olive Stanton
A Choral Director		Hiram Sherman	Maynard Holmes

== Broadcast ==
As reported, the live broadcast was in danger of going over-time. Despite signaling from the broadcast crew, conductor Bernard Herrmann didn't see any of the signalling but finished the work on time.

"It was a beautiful little work of Marc's," wrote Norman Lloyd. "In the booth at CBS while we did it sat Orson Welles, John Houseman and Kurt Weill. There were always exciting people around — people who became legends, but in those days we were all just working."

== Reception ==
Richard Gilbert of Scribner's Magazine praised the work over recent CBS commissions, remarking on the work's idiomatic use of radio as well as its "substance," "vitality" and "comparative simplicity." On the other hand, Aaron Copland noted the work's "hectic, nervous mood" and found "a synthetic quality about it that no amount of ingenuity and talent can hide."

== Adaptations ==
I've Got the Tune received its stage premiere on February 6, 1938, in a program that included works by Aaron Copland, Hanns Eisler, Lehman Engel, Alex North, Paul Bowles, Earl Robinson, Harold Rome, Virgil Thomson and Count Basie. The concert was a benefit for the magazine The New Masses and took place at the 46th Street Theatre. The performance presented what was done on air. The program was hosted by Orson Welles.

Welles arranged for the work to be reprised at the Mercury Theatre on two Sunday nights in February 1938. At its first presentation (February 20, 1938) it shared the bill with Ben Bengal's Plant in the Sun.

Despite the staged performance, Variety criticized the performance as a rendition of what was done on air, noting that the work's "present construction defeats its intentions." Declaring it being created for uncritical left leaning audiences, Variety said that the main problem was that it had several episodes which lack integration with each other. The unnamed critic found the tune of the title had an "evasive quality" that prevents the audience from remembering it and distances them from the story.

The work's Boston premiere took place December 5, 1970, at Harvard's Lowell House, in an adaptation by (and starring) Leonard Lehrman, attended by Blitzstein's nephew Christopher Davis and Leonard Bernstein. Musiker himself was beaten as "the mongrel", "Field Day" became "May Day," as in Blitzstein's original plan, the "Hangover Blues" scene was reinstated, and the final chorus became appropriately militant. Press response was very positive. This was probably the most successful performance the work ever had. Most recent were three performances honoring the 2005 Blitzstein Centennial. A recording on Original Cast Records incorporated the Suicide Scene from the 1970 production, recorded by WHRB.

== Recordings ==
A transcription of the broadcast was issued by Musicraft Records GM 212/281 in late 1937. The 1970 Boston premiere was recorded by WBAI Dec. 8, 1970 and first broadcast in 1995. Original Cast Records CD OC 6217 of the Blitzstein Centennial Concerts of Feb. 27, Mar. 5 & Mar. 6, 2005 included the complete 2005 production, except for Scene 4, taken from 1970.

== Miscellaneous ==
Blitzstein donated the manuscript for I've Got The Tune to an auction held February 20, 1939, at Hotel Delmonico, for the benefit of German refugees.
