= Curt Conway =

American actor

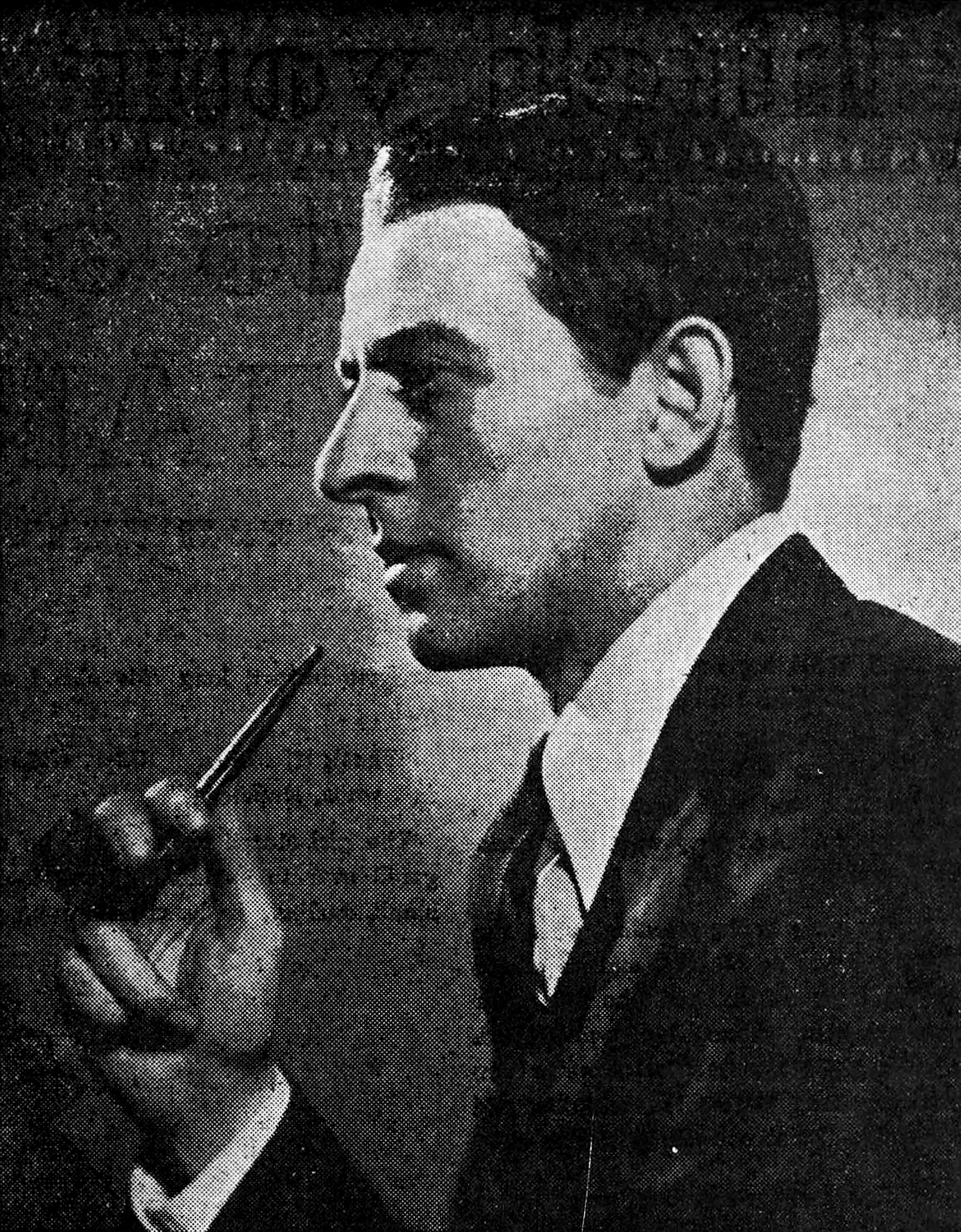
- Conway c. 1938
- Born: May 4, 1915; Boston, Massachusetts, U.S.
- Died: April 10, 1974 (aged 58); Los Angeles, California, U.S.
- Years active: 1947–1974
- Spouse(s): Sandra Francis (m. 19??; div. 19??) Kim Stanley (m. 1949; div. 1956) Gail Burton (m. 1970)
- Children: 1

Curt Conway (May 4, 1915 – April 10, 1974) was an American actor. He was sometimes billed as Curtis Conway or Kurt Conway. Born in Boston, Massachusetts, Conway appeared in a number of Broadway plays, had small parts in films. such as Hud (1963), and appeared on TV from 1960 until his death.

A member of the Group Theatre, and later the Actors Studio, Conway went on to found his own acting school, the Theatre Studio, in 1952. Located at 353 West 48th Street in Manhattan, its faculty included, at one time or another, Nora Dunfee, Robert Alvin, and fellow Actors Studio members Lonny Chapman and David Pressman. The Actors Studio also supplied some of the school's participating directors, namely Martin Ritt, Alan Schneider, and Joseph Anthony; also participating were Horton Foote and Everett Chambers. In the late 1960s and early 1970s, he taught acting at the School of Performing Arts in San Diego and the University of California, Irvine (UCI).

Conway was married three times, including to actress Kim Stanley from 1949 to 1956, with whom he had one daughter.

Conway died from a heart attack at the age of 58, in Los Angeles, California.

== Partial play credits ==
- Johnny Johnson* (1936)
- Marching Song* (1937)
- Casey Jones* (1938)
- The Time of Your Life* (1938)
- Quiet City* (1939)
- No for an Answer (1941)
- A View from the Bridge* / A Memory of Two Mondays* (1955)
- A Touch of the Poet* (1958)

* denotes Broadway productions

== Filmography ==
Film
Year	Title	Role	Notes
1947	Singapore	Pepe	
1947	Gentleman's Agreement	Bert McAnny	Uncredited
1947	T-Men	Shorty, Informant	Uncredited
1947	A Double Life	Reporter	Uncredited
1948	The Naked City	Detective Nick, Fingerprint Man	Uncredited
1948	Casbah	Maurice	
1948	Raw Deal	Spider	
1948	They Live by Night	Man in Tuxedo	Uncredited
1948	The Saxon Charm	Jack Bernard	Uncredited
1949	A Woman's Secret	Doctor	
1949	Knock on Any Door	Ed Elkins	Uncredited
1949	The Lady Gambles	Bank Clerk	
1949	Illegal Entry	Thin-Faced Man	Uncredited
1958	The Goddess	The Writer	Uncredited
1958	Wind Across the Everglades	Perfesser	
1961	Run Across the River	Engineer	
1963	Hud	Truman Peters	
1964	Invitation to a Gunfighter	McKeever	
1970	Macho Callahan	Judge	
1972	The Man		Uncredited
1973	Maurie	Dr. Stewart	
Television
Year	Title	Role	Notes
1949	The Front Page		1 episode
1963	The Twilight Zone	Adolf Hitler	1 episode
1963	The Alfred Hitchcock Hour	Dr. Buxton	Season 2 Episode 3: "Terror at Northfield"
1964	The Alfred Hitchcock Hour	Lieutenant Bromley	Season 2 Episode 21: "Beast in View"
1964	The Outer Limits	Franklin Karlin / Dr. Philip Mendl	2 episodes
1965	Voyage to the Bottom of the Sea	Dr. Winslow	1 episode
1965-1966	Peyton Place	Judge Irwin Jessup	17 episodes
1971-1974	The Odd Couple	Judge / Dr. Gordon	4 episodes, (final appearance)
1973	Hawkins	Judge	1 episode
