= The Airborne Symphony =

Musical work composed by Marc Blitzstein

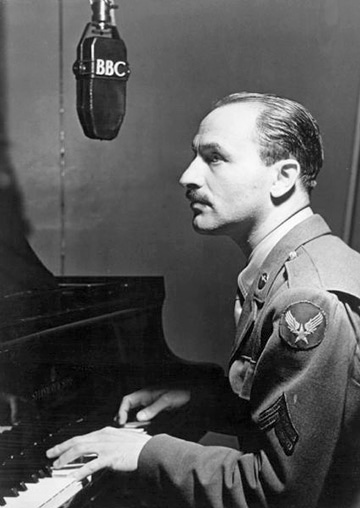
Marc Blitzstein in U.S. Army Air Corps uniform (London 1943)

The Airborne Symphony (also known as Symphony: The Airborne) is a work by American composer Marc Blitzstein for narrator, vocal soloists, male chorus, and large orchestra that premiered April 1, 1946. A history of human flight, the symphony uses music that the United States Army Air Forces, in which Blitzstein served during the World War II, originally commissioned for use in film.

== History ==
Marc Blitzstein began the war as a member of the U.S. Eighth Army Air Force's film division in London, England, working as a composer, scriptwriter, and translator. He was chosen to score a film on the history of aviation through his promotion to corporal in January 1943. Blitzstein also began work on the orchestral poem Freedom Morning that summer for eventual performance in the Royal Albert Hall.

Work on the Airborne score continued into 1944, with Blitzstein providing other services to the U.S. Army. By mid-1944, he had been promoted to sergeant and became music director of the American Broadcasting Service. The original film project did not come to fruition and Blitzstein, who composed his score for a large orchestra and male chorus, did not have the needed manpower for a wartime concert.

Blitzstein returned to the United States in May 1945. His score of The Airborne had been lost en route from England, but he was able to play sections of the work on piano for conductor Leonard Bernstein. Bernstein enthusiastically arranged its premiere for April 1946 and Blitzstein rewrote the score from memory. The original score was recovered, but Blitzstein preferred the newer version.

== Structure ==
The Airborne Symphony, while having symphonic elements, models itself largely after the choral cantata. The symphony is divided into three parts, with each part divided into subtitled sections. The Airborne is a highly dramatic work that connects the birth of flight with the role of airplanes in modern warfare:

- Part One
  - The Theory of Flight
  - Ballad of History and Mythology
  - Kittyhawk
  - The Airborne
- Part Two
  - The Enemy
  - Threat and Approach
  - Ballad of the Cities
  - Morning Poem
- Part Three
  - Air Force: Ballad of Hurry-Up
  - Night Music: Ballad of the Bombardier
  - Recitative: Chorus of the Rendezvous
  - The Open Sky (Finale)

As expected, the narrator holds a primary role in advancing the symphony's plot. The soloists and chorus provide commentary on the action. The symphony is comparable to works by Dmitri Shostakovich, American counterpart Samuel Barber, and the earlier works of Igor Stravinsky. Blitzstein, who subscribed to the artistic principles of socialist realism, wrote in a conservative style that was understandable on first hearing.

== Premiere ==
Presenting the history of human flight, The Airborne Symphony was first performed April 1–2, 1946, at New York City Center by the New York City Symphony Orchestra under the direction of Leonard Bernstein. Orson Welles was narrator; Charles Holland was tenor soloist and Walter Scheff was baritone soloist, with the male section of the Collegiate Chorale led by Robert Shaw. The work was officially dedicated to the Eighth Air Force.

== Reception ==
The New York Times reported that the audience received The Airborne Symphony with enthusiasm at its world premiere, and called the performance "remarkably sure, brilliant and dramatically eloquent." Since then, the work has been rarely performed, owing to its massive orchestral forces, topicality, and lack of standing with musicologists. The Airborne Symphony has passages of stunning musicality, but is also judged as a work of brazen propaganda with limited performing value in modern times.

Leonard Bernstein has been the symphony's best-known advocate, performing and recording the work in 1946 and 1966.

== Recordings ==
The Airborne Symphony was recorded in 1946, with Bernstein conducting the New York City Symphony Orchestra and Robert Shaw as narrator. Its releases include Pearl's 1998 CD Marc Blitzstein: Musical Theatre Premières (GEMS 1009).

Bernstein recorded the work with the New York Philharmonic in 1966, with Welles as narrator, tenor Andrea Velis as soloist, and William Jonson conducting the Choral Art Society. It was released as an LP in 1976 by Columbia Masterworks, and on CD in 2000 by Sony Classical.
