= Sacco and Vanzetti (Blitzstein opera) =

2001 opera by Marc Blitzstein and Leonard Lehrman

- Opera by Marc Blitzstein and Leonard Lehrman
- Premiere: August 17, 2001; White Barn Theatre, Westport, Connecticut

Sacco and Vanzetti is a 2001 opera by Marc Blitzstein and Leonard Lehrman.

== Development ==
In 1959, composer Marc Blitzstein began work on what he expected to be his magnum opus: a three-act opera based on the case of Sacco and Vanzetti. The Metropolitan Opera commissioned the opera with a Ford Foundation grant, but the production was canceled in September 1960 by the National Federation of Music Clubs for Blitzstein's membership in the Communist Party USA throughout the 1940s. The opera remained unfinished upon Blitzstein's murder in 1964. Another composer, Leonard Lehrman, finished the work almost four decades later as it premiered in August 2001 in concert performances with piano at the White Barn Theatre in Westport, Connecticut. The After Dinner Opera Company premiered an orchestral staged version in September 2022 at the Lehman College Studio Theatre in The Bronx, New York, staged by Benjamin Spierman, conducted by Lehrman. It was nominated for a Pulitzer Prize in December 2022.
