= Piano Concerto (Blitzstein) =

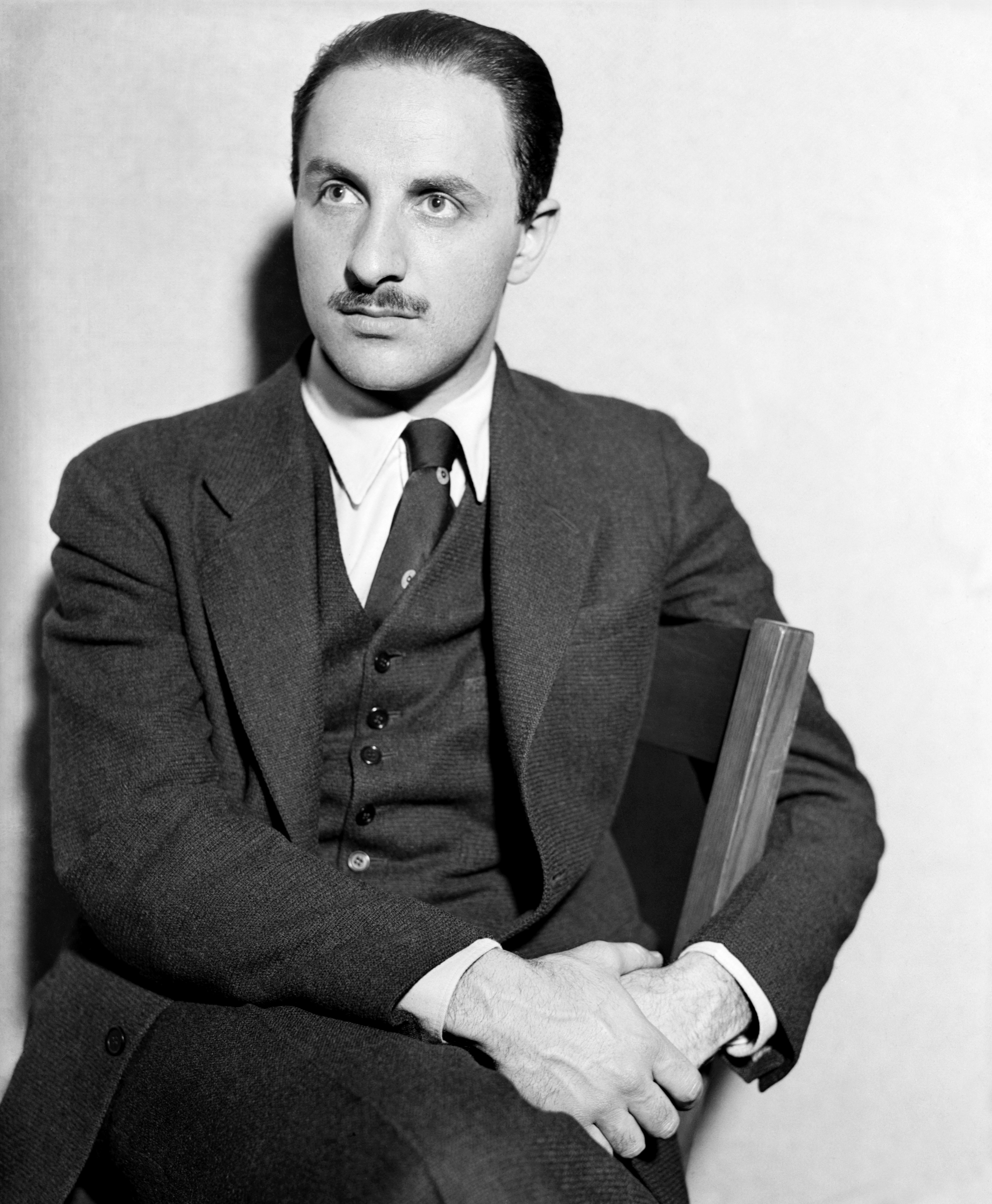
Marc Blitzstein in 1937

Marc Blitzstein wrote his Piano Concerto for piano and orchestra in 1931 when he was 25 years old. The concerto was not performed in public during the composer's lifetime; the Brooklyn Philharmonic premiered the piece on January 1, 1986, 22 years after Blitzstein's death. Prior to the premiere, it had only been heard publicly twice, once in a two-piano version. Blitzstein had hoped to be the piano soloist at the concerto's premiere.

The concerto, 24 to 30 minutes in length, is dedicated to musical patron Alene Erlanger.

== Form ==
The concerto has three movements:

1. Moderato molto-allegro
2. Largo assai
3. Allegro non troppo

== Orchestration ==
The sheet music is published by Boosey & Hawkes. They list the orchestration as

- Solo Piano
- 2 flutes + piccolo
- 2 oboes
- 2 clarinets
- 2 bassoons + contrabassoon
- 4 French horns
- 2 trumpets
- 2 trombones
- Bass trombone
- Tuba
- Strings

== Recording ==
A full recording of the work was made in 1988 by Michael Barrett with the Brooklyn Philharmonic under Lukas Foss (CRI CD 554). The first movement of the Piano Concerto was reissued on a CD titled Gay American Composers, vol. 2 (CRI CD 750). An excerpt from the third movement was issued on a sampler titled “Lollapalooza USA,” issued by Boosey & Hawkes (2005).
