= William Pierson =

American actor (1926–2004)

- Born: July 17, 1926; Brooklyn, New York, U.S.
- Died: August 27, 2004 (aged 78); Newton, New Jersey, U.S.
- Other name: Billy Pierson
- Occupation: Actor
- Years active: 1953–1984

William Pierson (July 17, 1926 – August 27, 2004) was an American television, motion picture and stage actor, best known for his raspy voice and his role as Marko the Mailman in the 1953 film Stalag 17 as well as a recurring role as Dean Travers on the 1970s ABC-TV series Three's Company.

== Biography ==
=== Life and career ===
Pierson, who was born and raised in Brooklyn, New York originally played the role of Marko in the original Broadway production of Stalag 17, and was tapped by director Billy Wilder for the role in the 1953 motion picture production. Other Broadway appearances included in High Button Shoes, Make Mine Manhattan, Reuben, Reuben, and in a national touring company of The Odd Couple. Pierson, who was well recognized by his distinctive, raspy delivery, also appeared in the Off Broadway production Smile, Smile, Smile. After Wilder brought him to Hollywood, he appeared in films such as Operation Madball and Fun with Dick and Jane (1977).

Pierson enjoyed a busy career in television and film, a career which spanned four decades from the 1950s through the 1980s, which included appearances on such TV shows such as Studio One and Kraft Theatre, The Jackie Gleason Show, All In The Family, One Day At A Time, Diff'rent Strokes, The Facts Of Life in addition to his role as Dean Travers on Three's Company.

Pierson died from respiratory failure in Newton, New Jersey. He had been residing for years at the Valley View Care Center in Newton due to declining health. He was survived by two brothers, Jefferson Pierson of New Jersey and Howard Pierson of Florida.

== Filmography ==
Year	Title	Role	Notes
1950	The Big Lift	Billy Pierson	
1953	Stalag 17	Marko the Mailman	
1957	Operation Mad Ball	Sgt. Perkins	Uncredited
1977	Fun with Dick and Jane	Nesbitt	
1977	All in the Family	Wino	”Mike, the Pacifist”
1977-81	Three’s Company	Dean Travers	
1978	Corvette Summer	Gas Station Salesman	
1993	Sani no yuutsu	Car Fixer	(final film role)
