= No for an Answer =

No For An Answer
- Original cast recording
- Music: Marc Blitzstein
- Lyrics: Marc Blitzstein

No for an Answer is a musical play by Marc Blitzstein. It was staged by W. E. Watts at Mecca Temple, west 55th Street, New York on Sunday, January 5, 1941. Although it was supposed to have a limited engagement, it ran for two additional Sundays. There was no scenery, and Marc Blitzstein was at the piano. It was an experiment under an agreement between the Dramatists Guild and Actors Equity. The cast included Olive Deering, Lloyd Gough, Martin Wolfson, Norma Green, and Curt Conway. It marked the New York debut of Carol Channing. It was much discussed before its opening, and Random House accepted it for publication just before its production. Brooks Atkinson stated in his review of the work in The New York Times: "it is very exciting in performance, which is all that matters." Although Aaron Copland called it one of "the most original works in that form composed in this county," the play was a failure.

After the first Sunday night performance, New York City License Commissioner Paul Moss issued a ban on performances because the Mecca Temple lacked a theater license and the auditorium had many building violations. He warned that if anyone tried to present the show the following week, they would be stopped by police and firemen.

The work was not in step with the times, and no one would underwrite a full production. A later concert performance in 1960 (Blitzstein again at the piano) constitutes the entire performance history of the piece during Blitzstein's lifetime. Howard Taubman reviewing the 1960 production for The New York Times wrote "it bogs down in a swamp of pedestrian cliches." The show finally received a fully staged production at the American Conservatory Theater in San Francisco on October 22, 2001.

== Plot ==
The plot of No for an Answer is based on the life and fate of the Diogenes Club, a social club of Greek-American waiters, hotel-workers, restaurant-workers, chefs, laundresses, chambermaids, taxi-drivers, who are out-of-work.

== Songs ==
- “The Song of the Bat” (sung by Charles Polacheck & Chorus)
- “Take the Book” (sung by Charles Polacheck & Chorus)
- “Gina” (sung by Hester Sondergaard)
- “Secret Singing” (sung by Lloyd Gough & Olive Deering)
- “Dimples” (sung by Coby Ruskin & Carol Channing)
- “Fraught” (sung by Carol Channing & Coby Ruskin)
- “Francie” (sung by Michael Loring & Norma Green)

- “No for an Answer” (sung by Ensemble)
- “Penny Candy” (sung by Curt Conway)
- “Mike” (sung by Bert Conway)
- “The Purest Kind of Guy” (sung by Curt Conway)
- “Nick” (sung by Martin Wolfson)
- “Make the Heart Be Stone” (sung by Ensemble)
- "No for an Answer" (sung by Martin Wolfson and Ensemble)

== Excerpted scenes ==
ACT I

- War of the Beasts and the Birds, The (from Act I Sc.1)
- Gina (from Act I Sc.3)
- Secret Singing (Act I Sc.4)
- Argument, The: What Is Capitalism? (Act I Sc.5)
- Fraught (from Act I Sc.6)
- Dimples (from Act I Sc.6)
- Outside Agitator (From Act I Sc.6)
- Francie (Act I Sc.8)
- Did They Think They Could Get Away with That? (from Act I Sc.11)
- Insist Song (Finale Act I)

ACT II

- Penny Candy (from Act II Sc.1)
- In the Clear (from Act II Sc.1)
- Get Mine (Act II Sc.3)
- Expatriate (from Act II Sc.5)
- Weep for Me (from Act II Sc.7)
- Mild and Lovely (from Act II Sc.7)
- Lullaby (Act II Sc.9)
- Purest Kind of a Guy, The (from Act II Sc.10)
- Insist Song (Finale Act II)

== Additional sources ==
- Cody, Gabrielle H.; Sprinchorn, Evert (2007). The Columbia Encyclopedia of Modern Drama. Columbia University Press. pp. 168–. ISBN 9780231144223.
- Bordman, Gerald (2001). American Musical Theater: A Chronicle. Oxford University Press. pp. 577–. ISBN 9780195130744.
- Mordden, Ethan (October 2013). Anything Goes: A History of American Musical Theatre. Oxford University Press. pp. 148–. ISBN 9780199892839.
