= Reuben, Reuben (opera) =

1955 opera by Marc Blitzstein

Reuben, Reuben is a two-act, "urban folk opera" (or a "musical play") by Marc Blitzstein, written from 1953 to 1955. Set in New York's Little Italy and inspired by the Faust legend, it concerns Reuben, a suicidal veteran who has received a medical discharge because he cannot speak. His disorder serves as an allegory of the difficulties of interpersonal communication in society, and of the eventual triumph of love over these difficulties and over the death wish. It was shown at the Shubert Theatre in Boston from October 10 to 22, 1955. Hanya Holm choreographed, Robert Lewis stage directed, and Cheryl Crawford produced the show.

Blitzstein himself described the opera as a, "picture of New York: the gaiety, plight, awareness and unawareness of anger, bitterness, insouciance, ardor, urgency, even wisdom, mellowness. All trapped: fighting the trap, or supine within it.”

== History ==
Following the completion of his opera Regina in 1949, Blitzstein began sketching out his next work. By April of 1950, the opera soon had its title, he soon struck the interest of director Cheryl Crawford and director Robert Lewis. In assistance with the libretto, Blitzstein worked with Lillian Hellman but the formal work on the opera began in 1953. In 1950, however, following the premiere of Gian Carlo Menotti's opera The Consul, an article written by Blitzstein in the Theatre Arts Magazine detailed his view that Menotti was safer than his last opera, The Medium. Regardless of the critique, Blitzstein saw the success of this genre and called the form of musical theatre "perhaps the first true American musical form". An early public showing of Blitzstein's opera was scheduled for March 16, 1950, the day after Menotti's The Consul premiered on Broadway.

By 1954, work was slowing down and becoming more difficult as the writing process was becoming too long for Blitzstein. Nevertheless, the first draft was completed in the early parts of 1954 and a contract by Cheryl Crawford was swiftly written up. Blitzstein did not stop editing the work and continued to revise sections up until its premiere on October 10, 1955. By 1964, the opera had been forgotten.

== Influence and references ==
Musicologist Howard Pollack has noted that Blitzstein had referred to many literary figures in the opera including classical figures like Homer and Aristotle, English writers and poets like William Shakespeare, John Keats, and Robert Shaw to Americans like F. Scott Fitzgerald, William Faulkner, and Hart Crane. Further influences upon Blitzstein came from Scottish playwright James Bridie and his 1949 comic play Daphne Laureola, along with American writer James Jones and his 1951 novel From Here to Eternity. Blitzstein also drew influence from the films of American filmmaker John Huston and American choreographer Jerome Robbins.

In terms of classical music references, Blitzstein was fascinated by the emotionality of Kurt Weill and Bertolt Brecht's 1928 musical play The Threepenny Opera. For his opera's form, Blitzstein looked towards Verdi's 1853 opera La traviata for a model. Other influences included Leonard Bernstein's Symphony No. 2 (Age of Anxiety) and Burton Lane's 1951 song, "Too Late Now".

In 1956, Blitzstein shared his views on opera, stating that the art form could take a lesson from the language of musicals, "opera can certainly learn from them, particularly in the matter of communicativeness".

== Roles ==
Roles, premiere cast
Role	Premiere cast, 10 October 1955
Reuben	Eddie Albert
Nina	Evelyn Lear (as Evie Shulman)
Countess	Kaye Ballard
Attilio	Enzo Stuarti
Bart	George Gaynes
Gisella	Sondra Lee
Blazer	Timmy Everett
Inmates, Police, Hustler, etc.	Thomas Stewart, Allen Case, Emile Renan, William Pierson, and Anita Darian.

== Plot ==
Place: Lower East Side, Manhattan (New York)
Time: 9:30 pm to dawn (early 1950s)

=== Act 1 ===
Scene 1:

At 9:30 pm, a pantomime unfolds between a small-time hustler Pez a lesson on pickpocketing to young vagrant Blazer. Soon, Reuben enters, a disheartened war veteran who reminisces about the good times in his life when he was part of a circus. Jane soon enters and asks Reuben for help in finding the BMT subway, however Reuben fails to speak and scares Jane away. Reuben commits himself to being able to speak and Fez soon returns, alarmed at Reuben's artificial demeanor, warning him that there are many thieves around. An Irish-American couple, Mr. and Mrs. J. Doakes, enter fighting which irritates Reuben, and soon Jane enters. They all hold a pleasant conversation and once Jane leaves the couple notice Reuben and soon exit. Reuben begins hating the world and decides to go for a drink.

Scene 2:

Place: The Bar
Time: 10:00 pm

Four "barflies" talk about their problems to the bar owner, Bart who is flipping coins anxiously as he's worried he'll lose power to his rival Malatesta. Soon, Reuben walks in which Bart takes as a sign from God. The two talk for a bit and Reuben gives Bart a note that says, "A high place." Bart's assistant Harry is tasked with helping Reuben find a place like this. Outside, Reuben passes two boys playing and sees one of the boy's shadow morph into a demon. He becomes fearful and states the words, "Bridge, that’s where." After his manic episode, he heads for the Manhattan Bridge. Harry is tasked to follow him while Bart places odds on his death with Malatesta while the "barflies" watch.

Scene 3:

Place: The Bridge
Time: 10:30 pm

The Italian-American woman Nina has just landed a job at a call center. To celebrate, she is lazily walking on the Manhattan Bridge but is 'rescued' by Reuben who thinks she is about to jump off. She interprets his advance as assault and a cop comes to rescue her. Realizing that Reuben was trying to save her, she poses as his girlfriend and shoos the cop away. As the couple walk away, the cop laments his treatment.

Scene 4:

Place: The Bar
Time: 11:00 pm

Bart begins to feel secure in his bet with Malatesta when Reuben and Nina enter. They talk about their new friendship and Nina invites Reuben to the San Gennaro festival in Little Italy, Manhattan. While Nina is in the bathroom, however, Bart encourages Reuben to commit suicide. Nina returns and senses Bart's malignant intentions. While they argue, Reuben escapes and is followed by Harry and Nina.

Scene 5:

Place: The Carnival
Time: 11:30 pm

Reuben and Nina are trying to find each other at the festival. However, Nina is being bothered by several friends and street vendors who are vying for her love. Once they find each other, the friends taunt the couple's love. Reuben entertains the crowd but Bart tries to get Reuben to talk about his father which the couple ignores, instead singing about love. Bart has Harry start a fight and Reuben tries to help but Nina gets him to leave.

Scene 6:

Place: The Column
Time: 12:30 pm

Reuben and Nina are sitting on a park bench together. Reuben, feeling remorseful, falls into a deep sleep on Nina's lap. When he wakes, they confess their love for each other. Soon, Bart's girlfriend appears and convinces them to come to the club "The Spot" where she works.

Scene 7:

Place: The Spot
Time: 1:00 am

The club is described by Blitzstein as a "tawdry, garish, sleazy, a Greenwich-village imitation of a fashionable night-club uptown." The Countess is performing a number when three girls perform a joint number after her. A fight between a black worker and a white patron upsets Reuben. The Countess eventually joins Nina, Reuben, and Bart at a table whereupon she tells the couple of Bart's bet. Reuben climbs to the chandelier and is encouraged to jump by Bart but dissuaded by Nina. Feeling unsure, when firefighters arrive with a net, he jumps and in the process reenacting his father's death.

=== Act 2 ===
Scene 1:

Place: The Wards
Time: 2:30 am

After a brief intermezzo, it is revealed that Reuben and Nina have been placed in a mental institution. The couple each help someone from their side of the institution, and the couple is eventually released.

Scene 2:

Place: The Bedroom
Time: 3:00 am

Nina and Reuben return to Little Italy while Bart waits for them, the arranger of their release. Having conquered death, Reuben plans to go to a party at Bart's to face him.

Scene 3:

Place: The Bar
Time: 4:30 am

A large group has arrived at the bar and the couple quickly arrive. Bart insults Reuben and Reuben wants to hit him but restrains himself. Bart still thinks Reuben will kill himself but he sees an upside down horseshoe and pushes Reuben who pushes Bart back. The Countess tells them to just leave and Harry finally quits.

Scene 4:

Place: The Bridge
Time: Dawn

A shipman is returning to his boat in Brooklyn by taking the bridge. He meets the couple and waves them goodbye. Reuben and Nina vow to start again.

== Reception ==
The opera's run in Boston was a failure: audience members left in the middle of the show, and critics panned it. Nevertheless, Leonard Bernstein named his daughter Nina after the play's heroine. It was never performed again.
