= Leonard Lehrman =

American composer (born 1949)

Leonard Jordan Lehrman is an American composer who was born in Kansas, on August 20, 1949, and grew up in Roslyn, New York. Since August 3, 1999, he has resided in Valley Stream, New York. Since March, 1995, he has served as a part-time Reference Librarian at Oyster Bay-East Norwich Public Library. Since August, 2014, he has served as High Holidays Music Director for The Metropolitan Synagogue.

His teachers included Lenore Anhalt, Elie Siegmeister, Olga Heifetz, the Guarneri Quartet, Elizabeth Korte, Earl Kim, Kyriena Siloti, Harry Levin, Nadia Boulanger, Jean-Jacques Painchaud, Leon Kirchner, David Del Tredici, James Yannatos, Karel Husa, William Austin, Robert Palmer, George Gibian, Tibor Kozma, Wolfgang Vacano, Donald Erb, and John Eaton. On July 31, 1978 he married Karen Shaw Campbell. They were divorced in November, 1986. On July 14, 2002 he married Helene Williams Spierman. They have collaborated on over 747 performances since March 1987, including 17 CDs and over 5000 videos on YouTube, with over 1,000,000 views to date.

He graduated cum laude from Harvard; received a master's degree and a doctorate in music composition from Cornell; a master's degree in library science from Long Island University and studied under a Fulbright scholarship in Paris with Nadia Boulanger. His first original opera was the subject of a 2014 doctoral thesis by Jeremy Blackwood, posted at https://digital.library.unt.edu/ark:/67531/metadc700028/m2/1/high_res_d/dissertation.pdf

== Life and career ==
Lehrman has composed 274 works to date, including 12 operas and 7 musicals. He composed also more than 400 vocal pieces. He won the 2002 Sunrise/Sunset Competition of the Brookhaven Arts Council in 2002 for his setting of Abel Meeropol (Lewis Allan)'s poem "Conscience". Since 1973 he has worked as conductor, coach, pianist, composer, and/or translator for the Metropolitan Opera (assistant chorus master 1977–78), Bel Canto Opera, After Dinner Opera Company, Aviva Players, the Metropolitan Philharmonic Chorus, the Jewish Music Theater of Berlin, the Jewish People's Philharmonic Chorus, the Workmen's Circle Chorus, the Oceanside Chorale, the Blaue Jungs/Hanseaten Deern German Chorus of East Meadow, and the Bronx Opera. He edited The Marc Blitzstein Songbook (3v., Boosey & Hawkes 1999–2003), authored Marc Blitzstein: A Bio-Bibliography (Greenwood/Praeger, 2005), and co-authored Elie Siegmeister, American Composer: A Bio-Bibliography (Scarecrow, 2010). His CONTINUATOR: The Autobiography of a Socially-Conscious, Cosmopolitan Composer was published by Dorrance Press in December 2024. He has also written for The Hilltop Beacon (critic-at-large, 1966–67), Harvard Crimson (critic, 1967–68), WHRB (chief producer, 1968–70), Dunster Drama Review (1970–71), Risley Review (1973–75), WBAI (Producer, "Music of All the Americas," 1989–91), Opera Monthly (associate editor, 1990–94), Opera Journal (critic, 1995–97; 2026- ), Aufbau (critic, 1995–2002), andante.com (2002), Jewish Currents (1981–present), New Music Connoisseur (2001–2016, part of that time as copy editor), Soundwordsight.com (2015–2024), and other publications.

His operas include Tales of Malamud (Idiots First (1973) – completion of work begun by Marc Blitzstein; Karla (1974); and Suppose A Wedding (1996), based on two stories and a play by Bernard Malamud); Sima (1976), based on The Krasovitsky Couple by David Aizman, tr. Edgar H. Lehrman; Hannah (1980) based on Midrashic legends, libretto in collaboration with Orel Odinov Protopopescu; The Family Man (1984), based on a story by Mikhail Sholokhov; The Birthday of the Bank (1988), in Russian (and English tr. by composer) on Anton Chekhov's Yubilei; New World: An Opera About What Columbus Did to the "Indians" (1991), libretto in collaboration with Joel Shatzky; Sacco and Vanzetti –completion of work begun by Marc Blitzstein; The Wooing (2003), libretto by Abel Meeropol based on Anton Chekhov's The Boor; The Triangle Fire (2016), libretto by Ellen Frankel, and A Loveletter from Rosa Luxemburg (2019).

His musicals include The Comic Tragedy of San Po Jo (1963), book & lyrics in collaboration with Mark Kingdon; Growing Up Woman (1979), book & lyrics by Barbara Tumarkin Dunham; Kommt, wir aendern die Welt! (1981), book & lyrics by Guenter-Heinz Loscher, translated into Brooklynese by composer as Let's Change the Woild!; E.G.: A Musical Portrait of Emma Goldman (1987), book & lyrics in collaboration with Karen Ruoff Kramer; Superspy!: The S-e-c-r-e-t Musical (1988–91, rev. 2014), book by Joel Shatzky, lyrics in collaboration; The Booby Trap or Off Our Chests (2001–2008), book by Sydney Ross Singer, lyrics in collaboration; Adam & Lilith & Eve (1993–2015), book by Manya Pruzhanskaya Lackow, additional music by Leo Kraft.

His translations include Bertolt Brecht's Days of the Commune (1971) and The Roundheads & the Pointedheads (1973), 20 Johannes Brahms songs, 13 Gerhard Bronner cabaret songs; Harry Oschitzki (Andy Orieli), Heinrich Heine and Alex Skovron cycles; and other poems and essays from the German; Emmanuel Chabrier's L'Etoile (1988) and An Incomplete Education (2006) and songs by Claude Debussy (10), Jacques Brel, and Georges Brassens from the French; songs by Ya'acov Rotblit and Naomi Shemer from the Hebrew; "In der Fremd" from the Yiddish by Leib Naidus; an ode by Euripides from the ancient Greek; Modest Mussorgsky's Zhenitba (Getting Married) (1973), Mikhail Glinka's A Life for the Tsar (1979), and Rusalka (Dargomyzhsky) (1986) from the Russian – in collaboration with his mother, Emily R. Lehrman (1923–2015), along with poems by Yevgeny Yevtushenko and Andrei Voznesensky (1967); Vladimir Mayakovsky (1970); Anna Akhmatova, Alexander Blok, Afanasy Fet, Ivan Krylov, Gavrila Derzhavin (all 1977); Velemir Khlebnikov and Alexander Pushkin (1986); Yefim Medvedovsky (2013–2016); and Galina Leybovich (2015). In 2016 he translated Sergei Slonimsky's opera King Lear, based on the Boris Pasternak Russian translation of Shakespeare, back into English.

From 1992 to 2003 he was Music Director at Malverne Community Presbyterian Church and from 1995 to 2001 at North Shore Synagogue in Syosset. Having worked at many other churches and synagogues, in February 2014 he became organist, choir director and composer-in-residence of Christ Church Lutheran in Rosedale, New York. In August 2014 he became High Holidays organist and choir director of the Metropolitan Synagogue in Manhattan. In October 2021 he became organist, choir director and composer-in-residence of Grace Episcopal Church in Massapequa, New York. Videos of preludes, postludes, and anthems he played and conducted there may be found here: https://www.youtube.com/playlist?list=PLmhHI8m9j-Xv39n2TOboU-4MCoe7e8Xbi.

May 1-Aug. 31, 2022 he was Minister of Music at Grace Lutheran Church, Malverne.

In the fall of 2022 he began playing masses at St. Barnabas' Roman Catholic Church in Bellmore.

In October 2022, he accepted the position of Conductor for the 2022-23 production of Princess Ida by The Gilbert and Sullivan Light Opera Company of Long Island and between April 16 & July 1, 2023 conducted 5 performances from the piano, 4 with full orchestra and chorus. His works and performances are represented on recordings by Opus One, Premier, Capstone Records, Albany Records, Original Cast (record label), Ravello (Parma Records), and Toccata Classics.

In the summers of 2024 and 2025 he conducted the Children's Choir, and played the organ for Church of the Atonement in Quogue, Long Island.

On Feb. 18, 2026 he became Interim Music Director, thru June 2026, at St. George's Church in Hyde Park, NY.

On Sept. 1, 2026 he became Music Director at St. John's Episcopal Church Tuckahoe in Yonkers, NY.

== Discography ==
- "Marc Blitzstein Music for Solo Piano" Toccata Classics 0438 (2019)
- "Harmonize Your Spirit With My Calm: Instrumental Works and Songs to Poetry of Russian and American Poets" by Leonard Lehrman & Joel Mandelbaum, with Helene Williams, Alexander Mikhalëv, the Meridian String Quartet, and the State Symphony Orchestra of St. Petersburg, Vladimir Lande, cond., Ravello Records 7951 (2016)
- Leonard Lehrman, Helene Williams, Lars Woodul, and the Metropolitan Philharmonic Chorus, "The Elie Siegmeister Centennial CD," Original Cast (record label) (2008)
- Helene Williams & Leonard Lehrman, "Diamond Jubilee: Songs By David Diamond," Albany Records (2006)
- Leonard Lehrman, "The Marc Blitzstein Centennial Concert CD," performed by Metropolitan Philharmonic Chorus & Soloists, Original Cast (record label) (2005)
- Lehman Engel, Herbert Haufrecht, Martin Kalmanoff, Robert Kurka, Leonard Lehrman, Joel Mandelbaum, Abel Meeropol, Earl Robinson, Elie Siegmeister, Kurt Weill, "The Abel Meeropol Centennial Concert," performed by Metropolitan Philharmonic Chorus & Soloists, Original Cast (record label) (2003)
- Leonard Lehrman, Gregory Mercer, James Sergi, and Helene Williams, "A Marc Blitzstein Songbook," Original Cast (record label) (2001)
- Eleanor Cory, Herbert Deutsch, Lukas Foss, Morton Gould, Andre Hosza, Leo Kraft, Leonard Lehrman, Joel Mandelbaum, Angelo Musolino, Raoul Pleskow, Elie Siegmeister, Hale Smith, Serge Suny, performed by Leonard Lehrman, "Long Island Composers Alliance," Capstone Records(1999)
- Ralph Alan Dale, Daniel Dorff, Denise Broadhurst, Janis Sabatino Hills, Leonard Lehrman, Joel Mandelbaum, Angelo Musolino, Elie Siegmeister, Hale Smith, Mira J. Spektor, and Raymond VunKannon, "Helene Williams Sings More Songs Of Love," "Long Island Composers Alliance," Capstone Records (1999)
- Adele Berk, Leonard Lehrman, Elie Siegmeister, Jeanne Singer, and Albert Tepper, "Helene Williams Sings Songs Of Love", "Long Island Composers Alliance,"Capstone Records (1997)
- Anne Watson Born, Becky Dale, Herbert Feldman, Frederick Frahm, Leo Kraft, Leonard Lehrman, Matthew Marullo, Akmal Parwez, Joseph Pehrson, Abram M. Plum, Harriette Slack Richardson, George Selbst, Judi Silvano, "The William Cullen Bryant Bicentennial Concert," "Long Island Composers Alliance," Capstone Records(1995)
- Ronald Edwards, Leonard Lehrman, Helene Williams, "A [Marc] Blitzstein Cabaret," Premier Recordings (1990)
- Leonard Lehrman, Peter Schlosser, and Helene Williams, The Metropolitan Philharmonic Chorus & Orchestra, "We Are Innocent: Rosenberg Cantata," Opus One (1989)
