= Caesar (Mercury Theatre) =

1937 stage play by Orson Welles

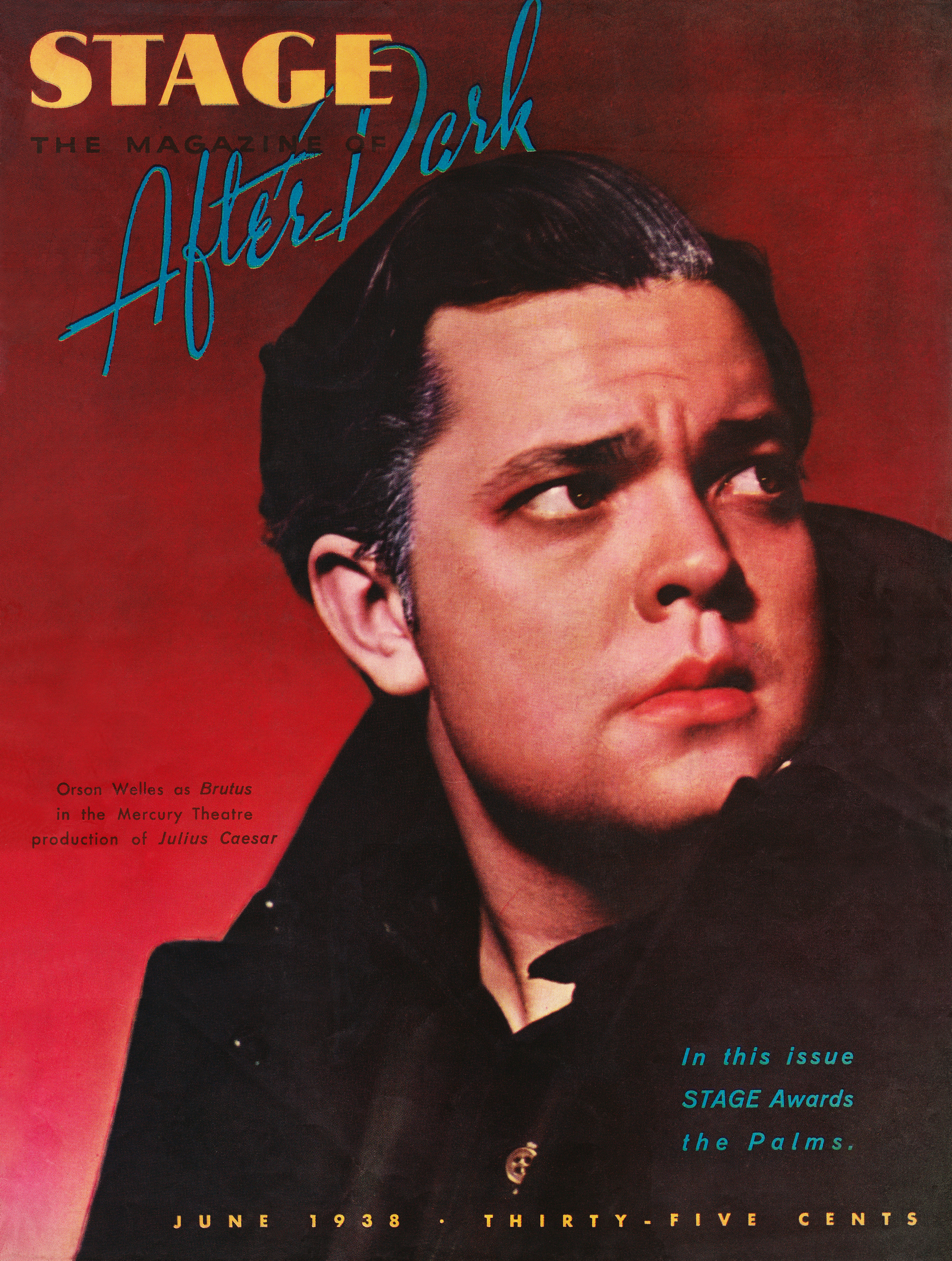
- Orson Welles as Marcus Brutus, as seen on the cover of Stage magazine from June 1938
- Original language: English
- Written by: William Shakespeare (play); Orson Welles (adaptation)
- Genre: Tragedy

Premiere
- Date: November 11, 1937
- Place: Mercury Theatre, New York City, New York

Caesar is a 1937 adaptation of William Shakespeare's Julius Caesar by Orson Welles, an innovative, modern-dress bare-stage production that evoked comparison to contemporary Fascist Italy and Nazi Germany. Considered Welles's highest achievement in the theatre, it premiered November 11, 1937, as the first production of the Mercury Theatre, an independent repertory theatre company that presented an acclaimed series of productions on Broadway through 1941.

== Production ==
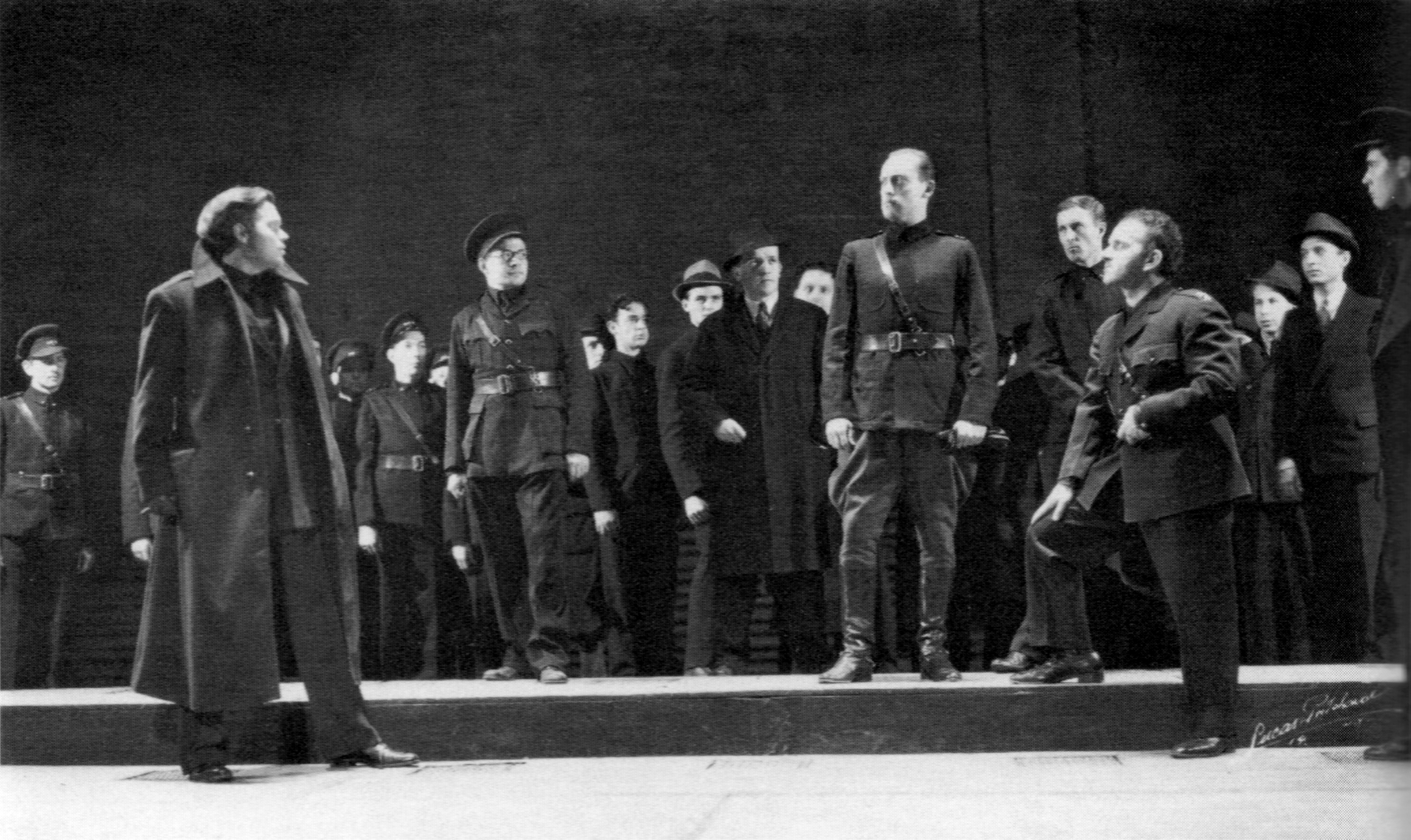
"I am constant as the Northern Star": Caesar (Joseph Holland, standing at center) addresses Brutus (Orson Welles, left) and the conspirators shortly before his assassination in Caesar (1937)

It would have been a fascinating experiment even if it had failed. That it succeeds so admirably is enough to blow the hinges off the dictionary.

— John Anderson, New York Journal

Breaking with the Federal Theatre Project in 1937, Orson Welles and John Houseman founded their own repertory company, which they called the Mercury Theatre. The name was inspired by the title of the iconoclastic magazine, The American Mercury. The original company included such actors as Joseph Cotten, George Coulouris, Geraldine Fitzgerald, Ruth Ford, Arlene Francis, Martin Gabel, John Hoysradt, Whitford Kane, Norman Lloyd, Vincent Price, Erskine Sanford, Stefan Schnabel and Hiram Sherman.

The Mercury Theatre opened November 11, 1937, with Caesar—Welles's modern-dress adaptation of Shakespeare's tragedy Julius Caesar, streamlined into an anti-fascist tour de force that Joseph Cotten later described as "so vigorous, so contemporary that it set Broadway on its ear." The set was completely open with no curtain, and the brick stage walls were painted dark red. Scene changes were achieved by lighting alone. On the stage was a series of risers; squares were cut into one riser at intervals and lights were set beneath it, pointing straight up to evoke the "cathedral of light" at the Nuremberg Rallies. "He staged it like a political melodrama that happened the night before," said Norman Lloyd, who played the role of Cinna the Poet.

In a scene that became the fulcrum of the show, Cinna the Poet dies at the hands not of a mob but of a secret police force. Lloyd called it "an extraordinary scene [that] gripped the audience in a way that the show stopped for about three minutes. The audience stopped it with applause."

In addition to adapting the text, Welles directed the production and performed the role of Marcus Brutus. Music was by Marc Blitzstein; sets were by Samuel Leve; the production manager and lighting designer was Jean Rosenthal. Rehearsals began October 21, 1937. At the end of October, press agent Henry Senber oversaw a ceremony unveiling the new electric sign identifying the theatre as the Mercury. Ticket prices ranged from 55 cents, for seats in the top balcony, to $2.20 for front row orchestra seats.

The production moved from the Mercury Theatre to the larger National Theatre on January 24, 1938. It ran through May 28, 1938, for a total of 157 performances.

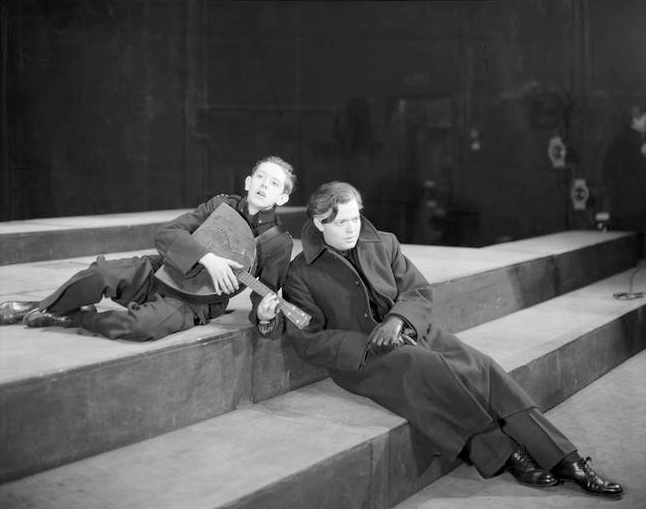
Arthur Anderson (Lucius) and Orson Welles (Brutus) in the tent scene in Caesar (1937)

"Caesar was unquestionably Welles's highest achievement in the theatre," wrote critic Richard France.

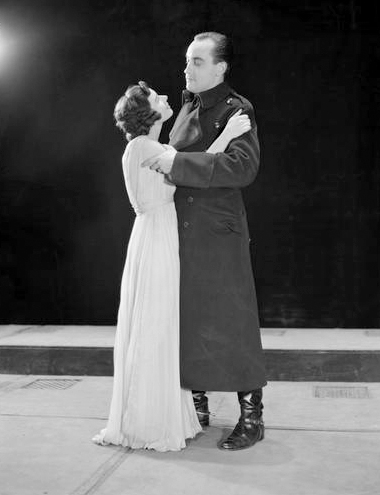
Evelyn Allen (Calpurnia) and Joseph Holland (Julius Caesar) in Caesar (1937)

At least two memorable incidents marked the production. Arthur Anderson, who played the role of young Lucius, found himself bored and lonely in his third-floor dressing room at the National Theatre. During the matinee performance on March 10, 1938, he stood on a chair and lifted a match to a sprinkler head—accidentally setting off the fire-sprinkler system. Water poured under a fire door down onto the main switchboard and began pooling at Welles's feet during the funeral oration. The show was delayed 15 minutes as electricians worked and stagehands mopped the floor. Anderson kept his job, but he was charged $30 for sprinkler repairs and was required to have an extra at his side for two weeks at $1 a show. The incident is fictionalized in Robert Kaplow's novel Me and Orson Welles (2003) and its 2008 film adaptation.

Actor Joseph Holland, who played the title role in Caesar, was accidentally stabbed by Welles during the performance on April 6, 1938. Welles performed with a real dagger, which caught the light dramatically during the assassination scene. Holland collapsed on the stage floor and remained motionless, and in time the cast members realized that he was bleeding profusely. At the end of the scene he was taken by taxi to the hospital. During the month it took Holland to recover, the role of Caesar was played by John Hoysradt. Holland returned to the Caesar cast on May 5, 1938.

=== Cast ===
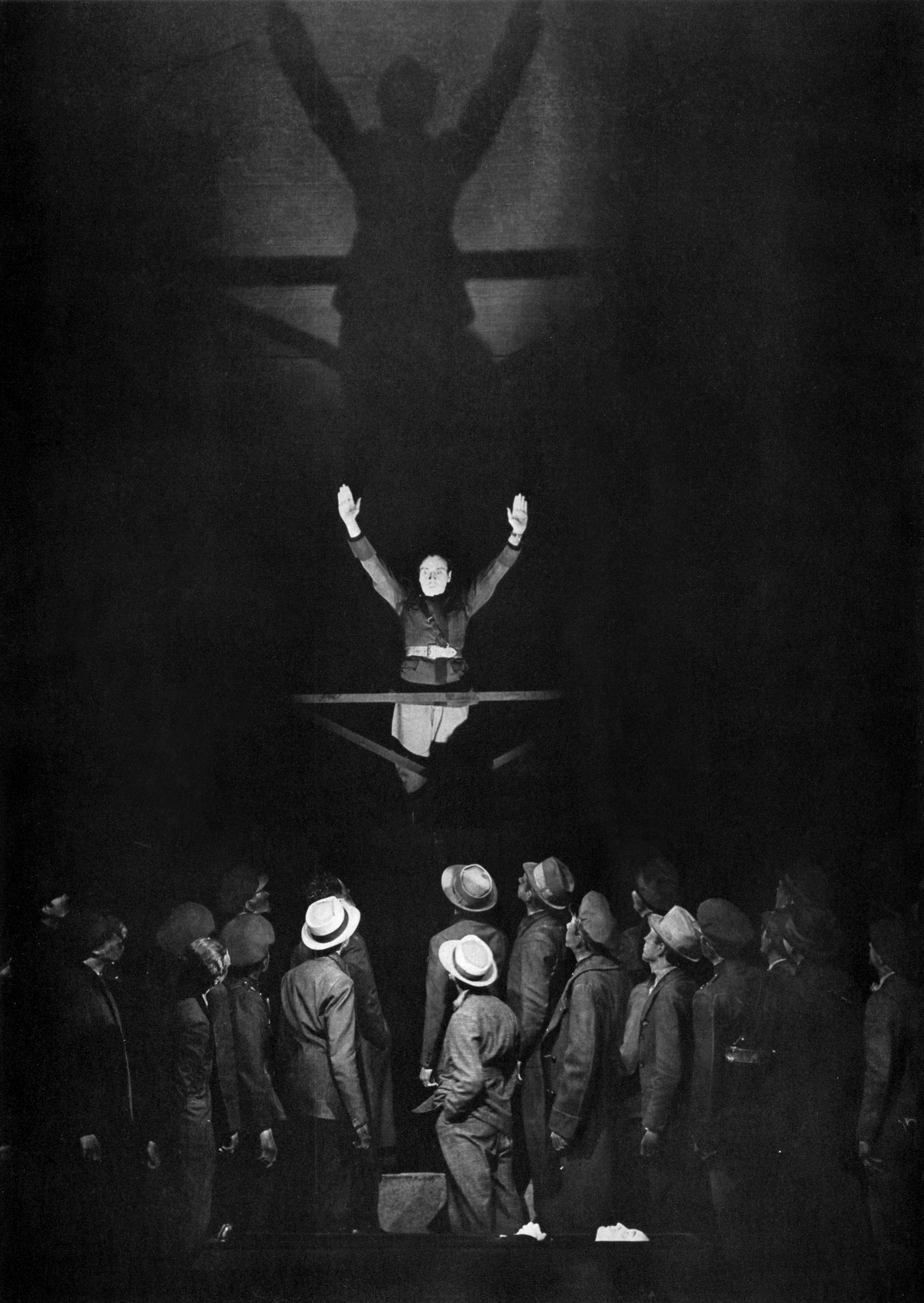
Marc Antony (George Coulouris) addresses the crowd in Caesar (1937)

- Joseph Holland as Julius Caesar
- George Coulouris as Marcus Antonius
- Joseph Cotten as Publius
- Orson Welles as Marcus Brutus
- Martin Gabel as Cassius
- Hiram Sherman as Casca
- John A. Willard as Trebonius
- Grover Burgess as Ligarius
- John Hoysradt as Decimus Brutus
- Stefan Schnabel as Metellus Cimber
- Elliott Reid as Cinna
- William Mowry as Flavius
- William Alland as Marullus
- George Duthie as Artemidorus
- Norman Lloyd as Cinna, the poet
- Arthur Anderson as Lucius
- Evelyn Allen as Calpurnia, wife to Caesar
- Muriel Brassler as Portia, wife to Brutus

=== Gallery ===
Herbert Kehl's color photographs in the June 1938 issue of Coronet magazine are from the production after it moved from the Mercury Theatre to the larger National Theatre in January. At the National Theatre, Polly Rowles took the role of Calpurnia and Alice Frost played Portia.

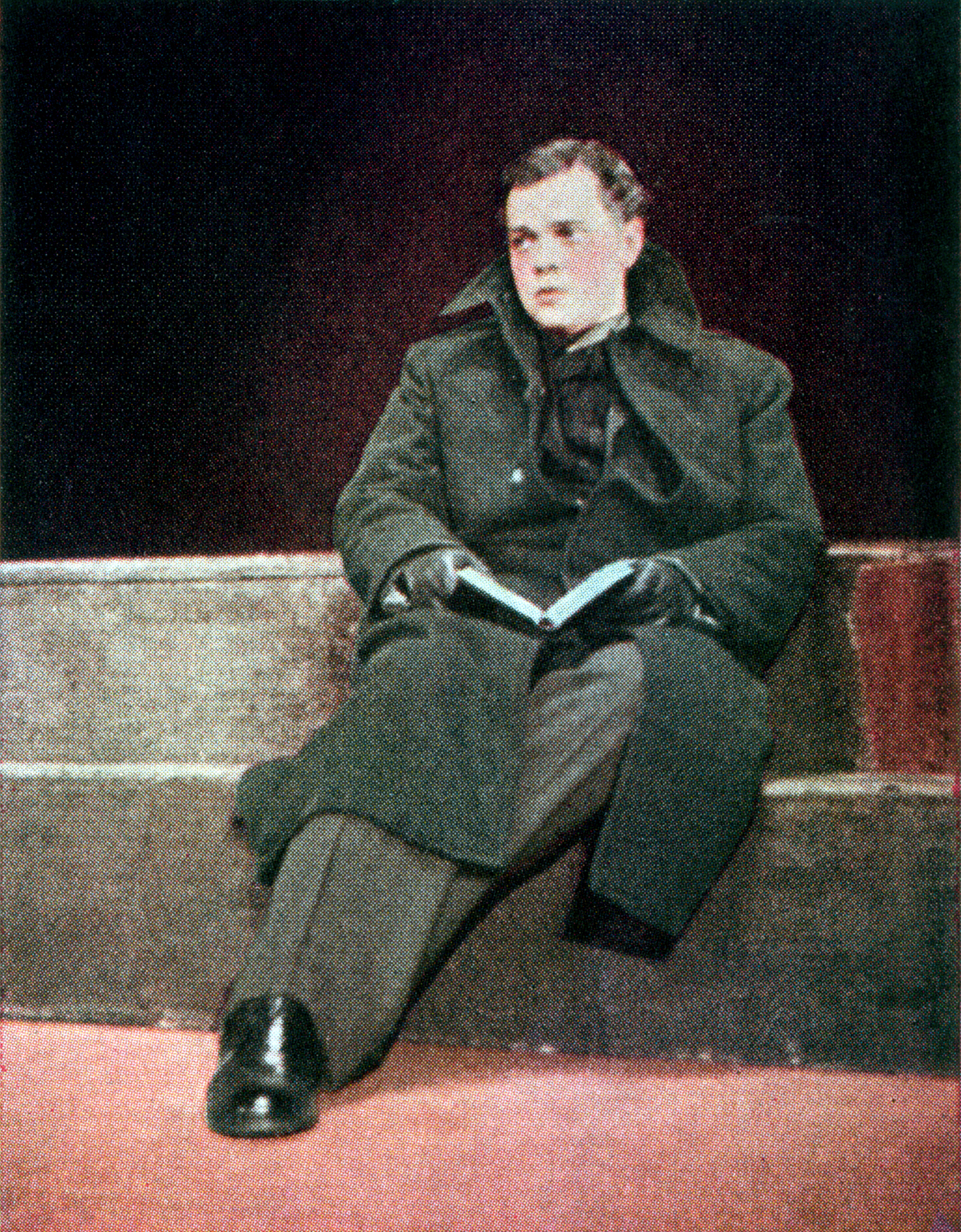
Brutus (Orson Welles)

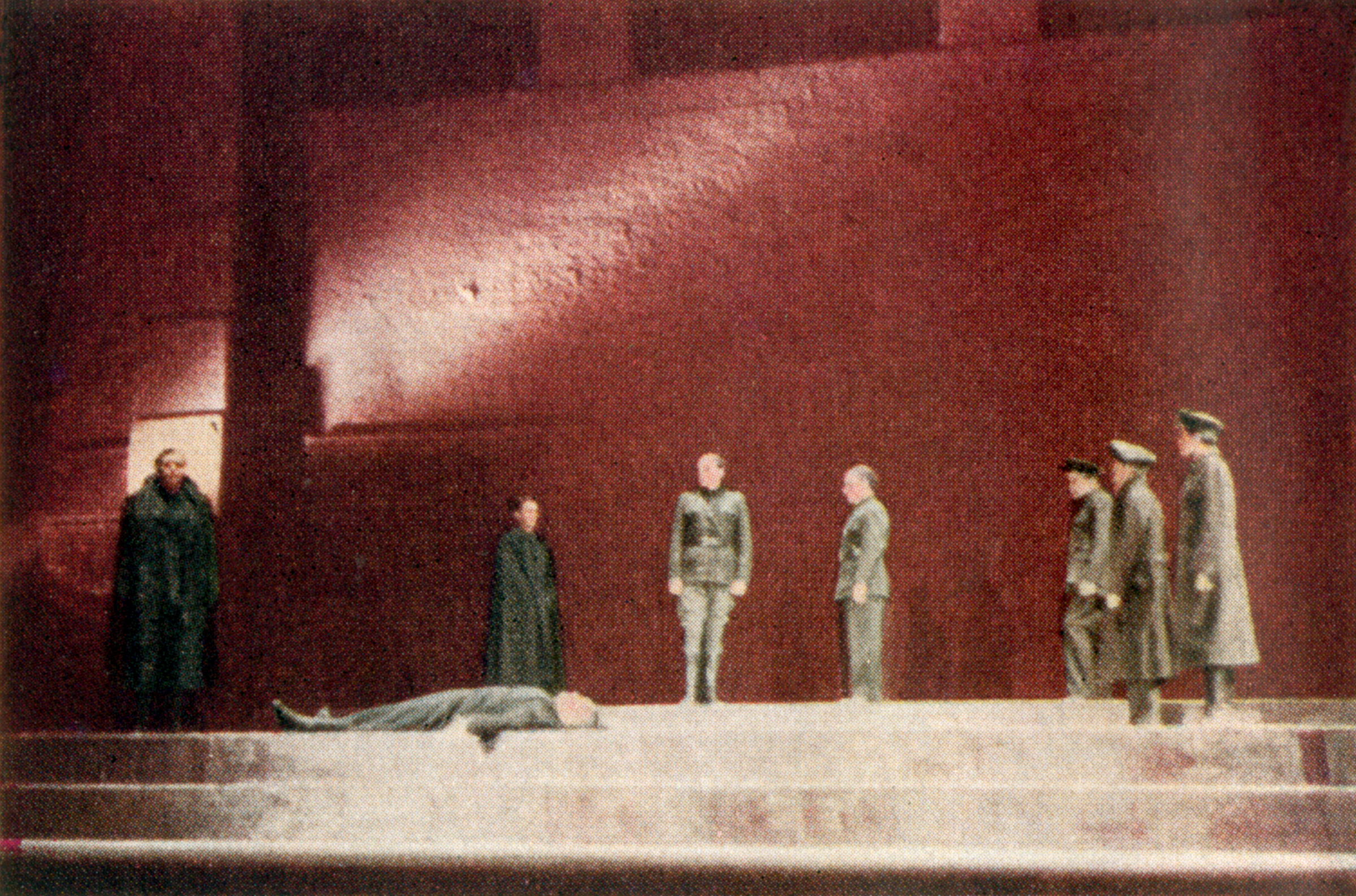
Standing over the murdered body of Caesar, Brutus (Orson Welles) is confronted by Marc Antony (George Coulouris) and Cassius (Martin Gabel)

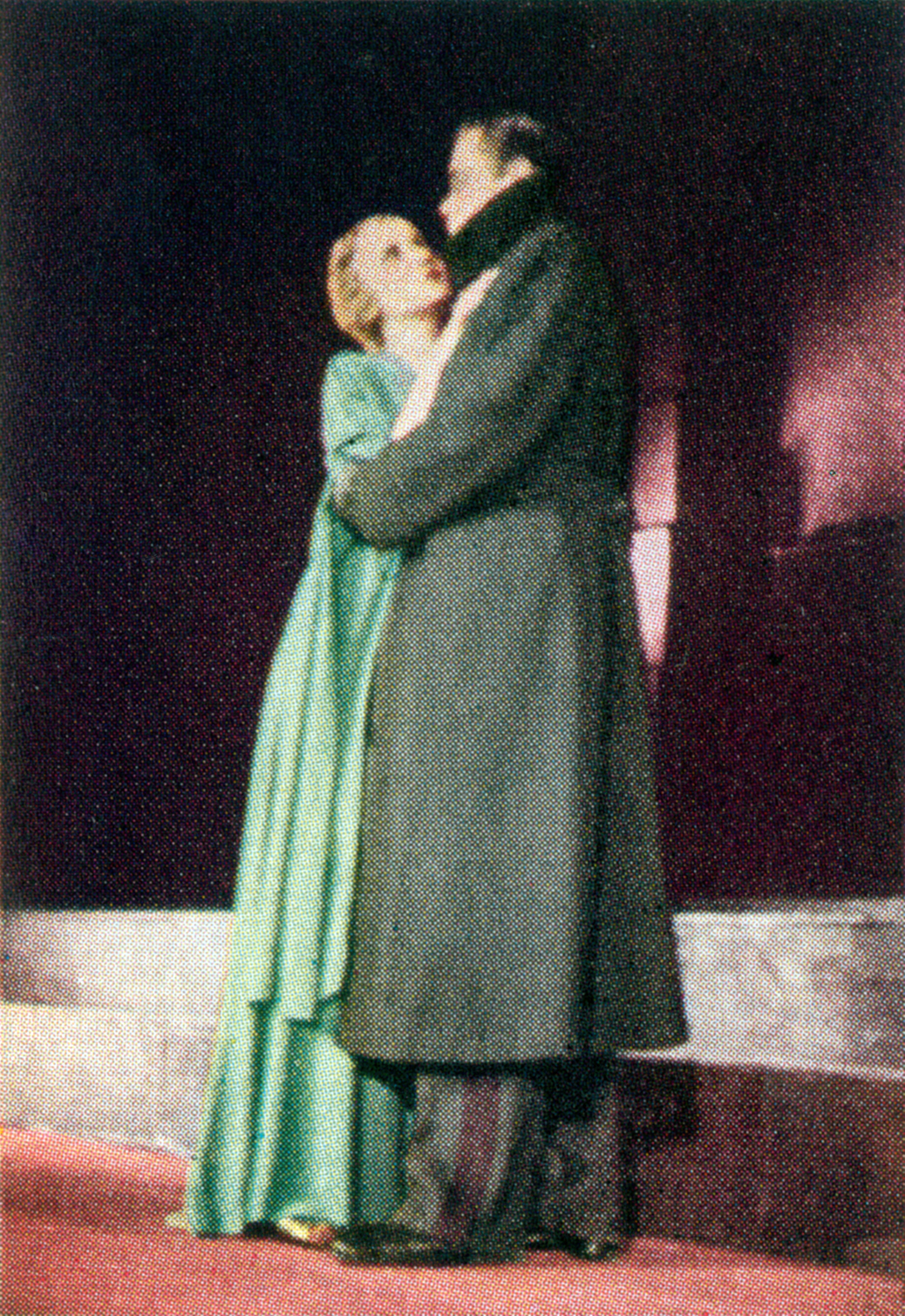
Portia (Alice Frost) and Brutus (Orson Welles)

== Reception ==
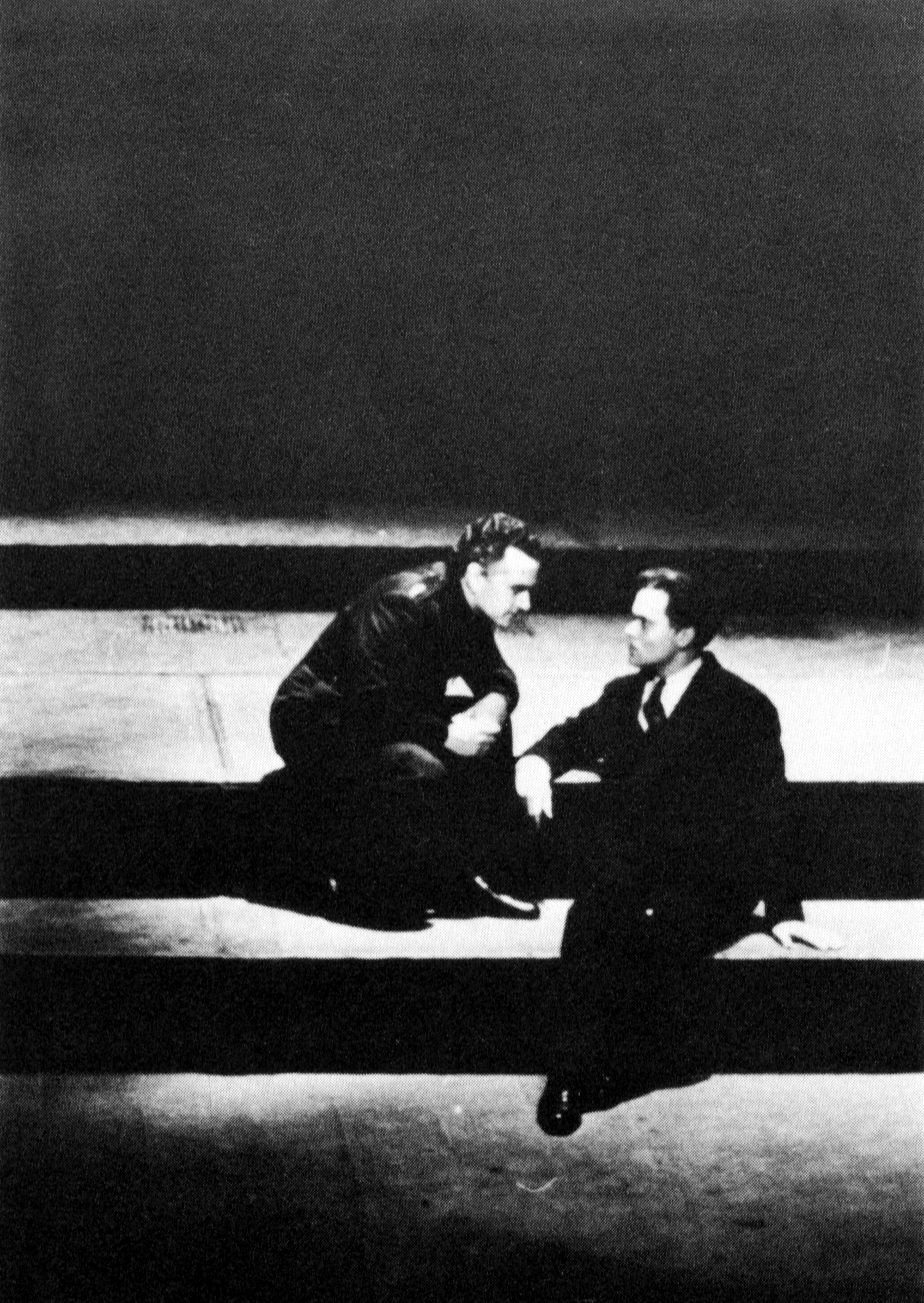
Cassius (Martin Gabel) and Brutus (Orson Welles) in Caesar (Act I, Scene 2)

Unable to attend on opening night, drama critic John Mason Brown asked to review the matinee preview of Caesar—"a troublesome request", wrote producer John Houseman, but one that was granted. At the end of the performance, Brown asked to be taken backstage. "Orson, sitting before his makeup table in his green military greatcoat, looked up in consternation as one of the country's leading drama critics burst into the dressing room and started to tell us such things about the production as we had not hoped to hear even in our most megalomaniacal dreams," Houseman recalled. In his New York Post review, Brown called Caesar "by all odds the most exciting, the most imaginative, the most topical, the most awesome and the most absorbing of the season's new productions. The touch of genius is upon it."

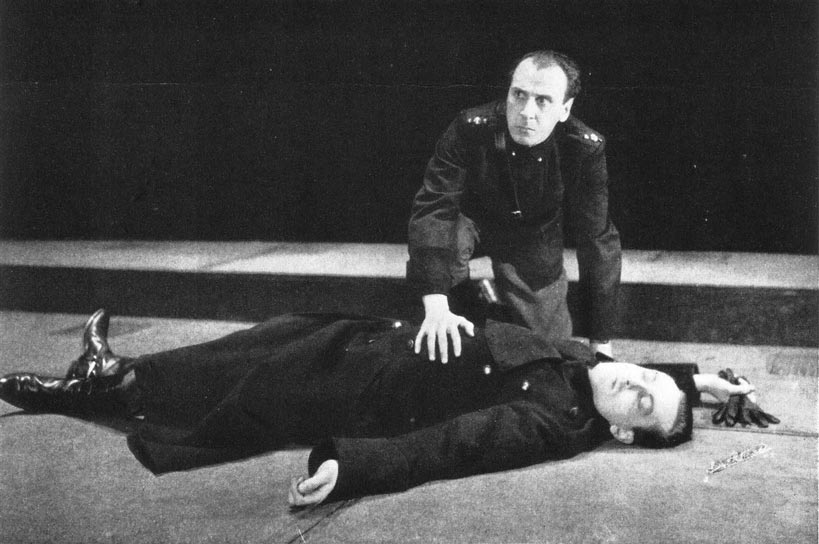
Antony (George Coulouris) kneels over the body of Brutus (Orson Welles) at the conclusion of Caesar

"Bard Boffola" read Variety. Heywood Broun called Caesar "the most exhilarating play in New York". "Greatly conceived and brilliantly executed, it is the most vivid production of Shakespeare seen in New York in this generation," wrote The Nation. In the New York Herald Tribune, critic Richard Watts called it "a production so exciting and imaginative, so completely fascinating in all its phases, there is nothing to do but let ourselves go and applaud it unreservedly. Here, splendidly acted and thrillingly produced is what must certainly be the great Julius Caesar of our time."

Stage magazine awarded Welles the palm, its citation of excellence, and featured him (as Brutus) on the cover of its June 1938 issue:

To Orson Welles, director, man of letters, disciple of classic repertory, for the season's most outstanding contribution to the American stage—the Mercury Theatre. For founding that theatre, with John Houseman. For the vision, the courage, the executive art which accompanied its founding. For establishing a uniformly excellent repertory company. For the editing, direction, lighting, presentation scheme of Julius Caesar, which made the Mercury's bare-stage, modern-dress production of that classic one of the most exciting dramatic events of our time.

== Touring production ==
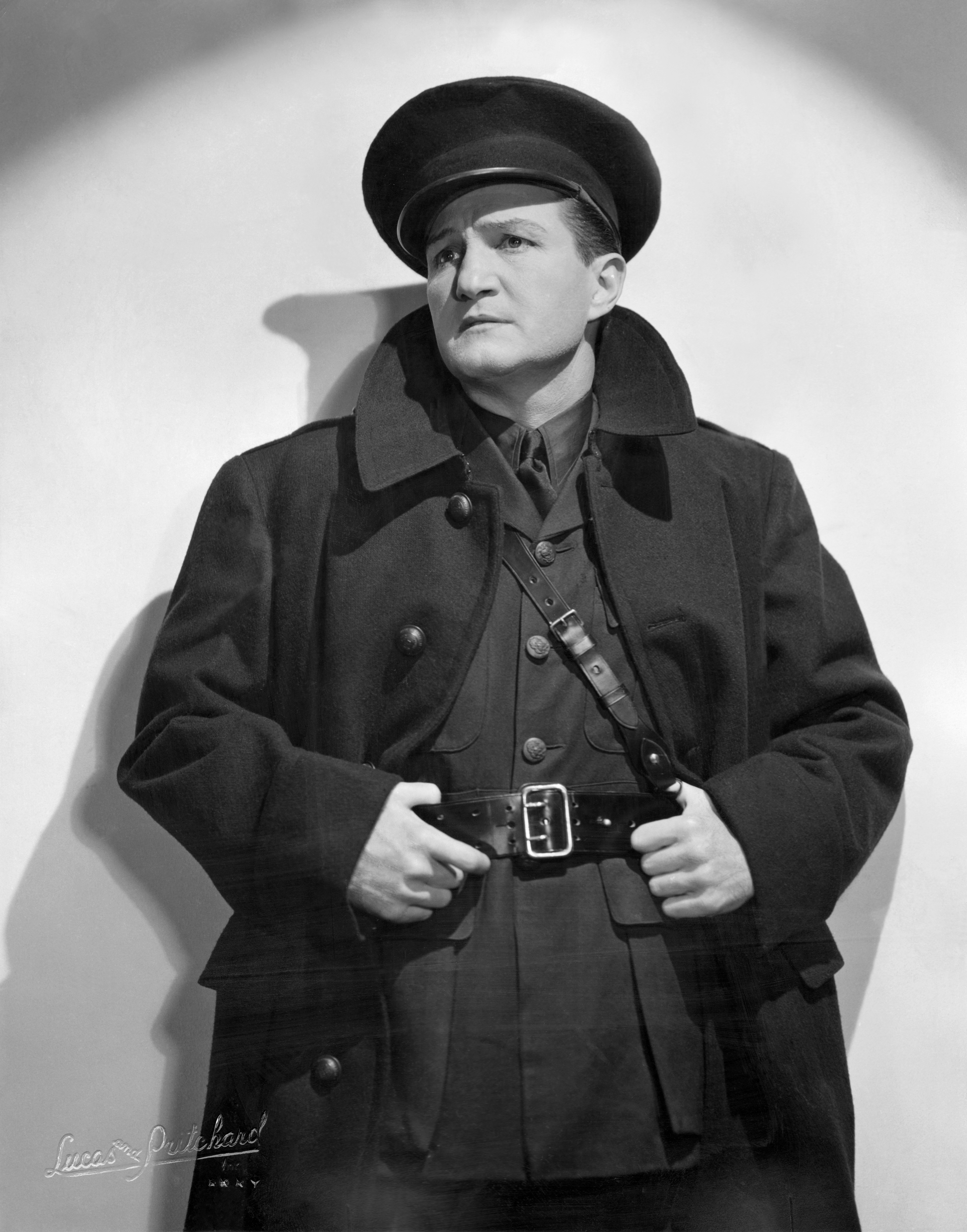
Tom Powers played Brutus in the national touring production of Caesar, then succeeded Welles in the Broadway production (1938).

In financial straits from the outset, the Mercury briefly considered exploiting the sensational success of Caesar by continuing a straight run of the play and setting aside its repertory mission. Instead, the company went into rehearsal with two new productions and accepted a proposal for a road tour of Caesar. Producer Alex Yokel offered a $5,000 advance and 50 percent of the profits, and Welles and Houseman began casting the road company. Tom Powers, a leading actor with the Theatre Guild and a principal in the original production of Strange Interlude, led the company as Brutus. Houseman wrote that Powers "lacked some of Orson's 'high-souled nobility' but he had sincerity and authority." Also in the cast were Lawrence Fletcher (Caesar), Vincent Donehue (Cinna the Poet), Herbert Ranson (Cassius, later played by Morgan Farley), Edmond O'Brien (Marc Antony), Edgar Barrier (Casca), Helen Craig (Calpurnia), Muriel Brassler (Portia) and a supporting ensemble of 60.

The five-month national tour of Caesar began January 17, 1938, in Providence, Rhode Island. The itinerary included Hartford and New Haven, Connecticut, Boston (Colonial Theatre), Washington, D.C. (National Theatre), Baltimore (Ford's Theater), Philadelphia, Pittsburgh, Chicago (Erlanger Theatre), St. Louis (American Theatre), Milwaukee (Davidson Theatre), Madison (Parkway Theatre) and Toronto. Welles flew to Chicago to personally supervise the production.

The roadshow Caesar elicited great critical acclaim, but attendance did not meet expectations. The Mercury Theatre did not see a half-share of profits from the touring production because it never went into the black. "These financial set-backs, whose implications would eventually catch up with them in ways that could scarcely have been predicted, did nothing to daunt their high spirits," wrote biographer Simon Callow.

Brutus received particular praise: "Tom Powers has been vouchsafed the opportunity to reveal, as never before, his innate soundness of spirit," wrote Florence Fisher Parry in The Pittsburgh Press. Powers replaced Welles in Caesar at the National Theatre when Heartbreak House got under way. "I remember his Brutus as a good, earnest performance," wrote Arthur Anderson, who played the role of young Lucius, "but he did not have half the pent-up energy or the vocal dynamics in the role as did Orson Welles." In the final weeks of Caesar on Broadway, Edmond O'Brien replaced George Coulouris, who was also performing in Heartbreak House.

== Original cast recording ==
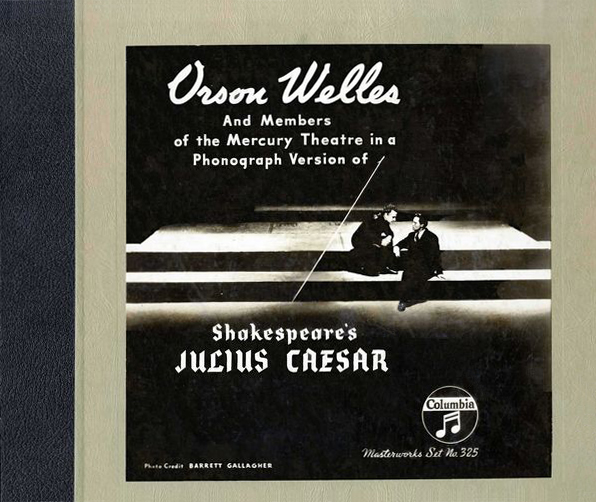
Cover of the 1938 original cast recording of Caesar

In March 1938, members of the original cast recorded highlights from Caesar for Columbia Masterworks Records. With incidental music by Marc Blitzstein, the recording features Orson Welles (Brutus), Joseph Holland (Caesar), George Coulouris (Marcus Antonius), Martin Gabel (Cassius), Hiram Sherman (Casca), John Hoyt (Decius Brutus), and John A. Willard (Trebonius, Volumnius). A set of five 12" 78 rpm records was released in 1939. In 1998, the recording was released on compact disc, with Welles's Mercury Text Records recording of Twelfth Night, on the Pearl label. It is also available at the Internet Archive.

== Cultural references ==
Cinna the Poet (1959), a painting by Jacob Landau created 20 years after the pivotal scene in Caesar was performed, is in the collection of the Museum of Modern Art.

Richard Linklater's 2008 film Me and Orson Welles is a romantic comedy set during the days before the opening of Caesar at the Mercury Theatre. Christian McKay received numerous accolades for his portrayal of Welles, and Me and Orson Welles was named one of the top ten independent films of 2009 by the National Board of Review. Wall Street Journal drama critic Terry Teachout reserved special praise for the film's recreation of Caesar: "What makes Me and Orson Welles uniquely interesting to scholars of American drama is that Mr. Linklater's design team found the Gaiety Theatre on the Isle of Man. This house closely resembles the old Comedy Theatre on 41st Street, which was torn down five years after Julius Caesar opened there. Using Samuel Leve's original designs, they reconstructed the set for Julius Caesar on the Gaiety's stage. Then Mr. Linklater filmed some 15 minutes' worth of scenes from the play, lit according to Jean Rosenthal's plot, accompanied by Marc Blitzstein's original incidental music and staged in a style as close to that of the 1937 production as is now possible." Teachout wrote that he "was floored by the verisimilitude of the results".
