= Marc Blitzstein =

American composer (1905–1964)

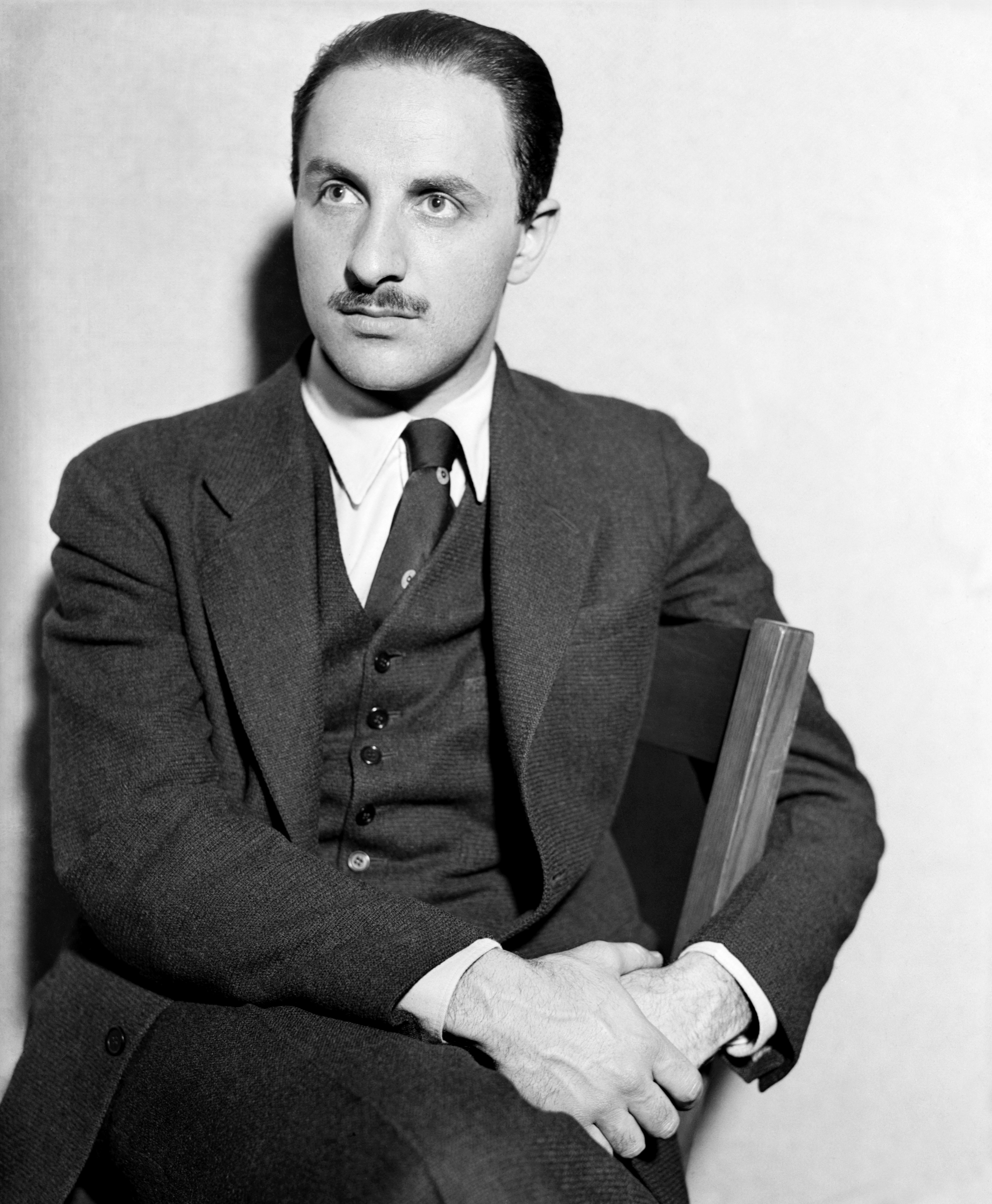
- Blitzstein in 1937
- Born: Marcus Samuel Blitzstein; March 2, 1905; Philadelphia, Pennsylvania, US
- Died: January 22, 1964 (aged 58); Martinique
- Occupations: Composer; lyricist; librettist
- Years active: 1926–1964

Marcus Samuel Blitzstein (March 2, 1905 – January 22, 1964), was an American composer, lyricist, and librettist. He won national attention in 1937 when his pro-union musical The Cradle Will Rock, directed by Orson Welles, was shut down by the Works Progress Administration. He is known for The Cradle Will Rock and for his off-Broadway translation and adaptation of The Threepenny Opera by Bertolt Brecht and Kurt Weill. His works also include the opera Regina, an adaptation of Lillian Hellman's play The Little Foxes; the Broadway musical Juno, based on Seán O'Casey's play Juno and the Paycock; and No for an Answer. He completed translations and adaptations of Brecht's and Weill's musical play Rise and Fall of the City of Mahagonny and of Brecht's play Mother Courage and Her Children with music by Paul Dessau. Blitzstein also composed music for films, such as Surf and Seaweed (1931) and The Spanish Earth (1937), and he contributed two songs to the original 1960 production of Hellman's play Toys in the Attic.

== Life and career ==
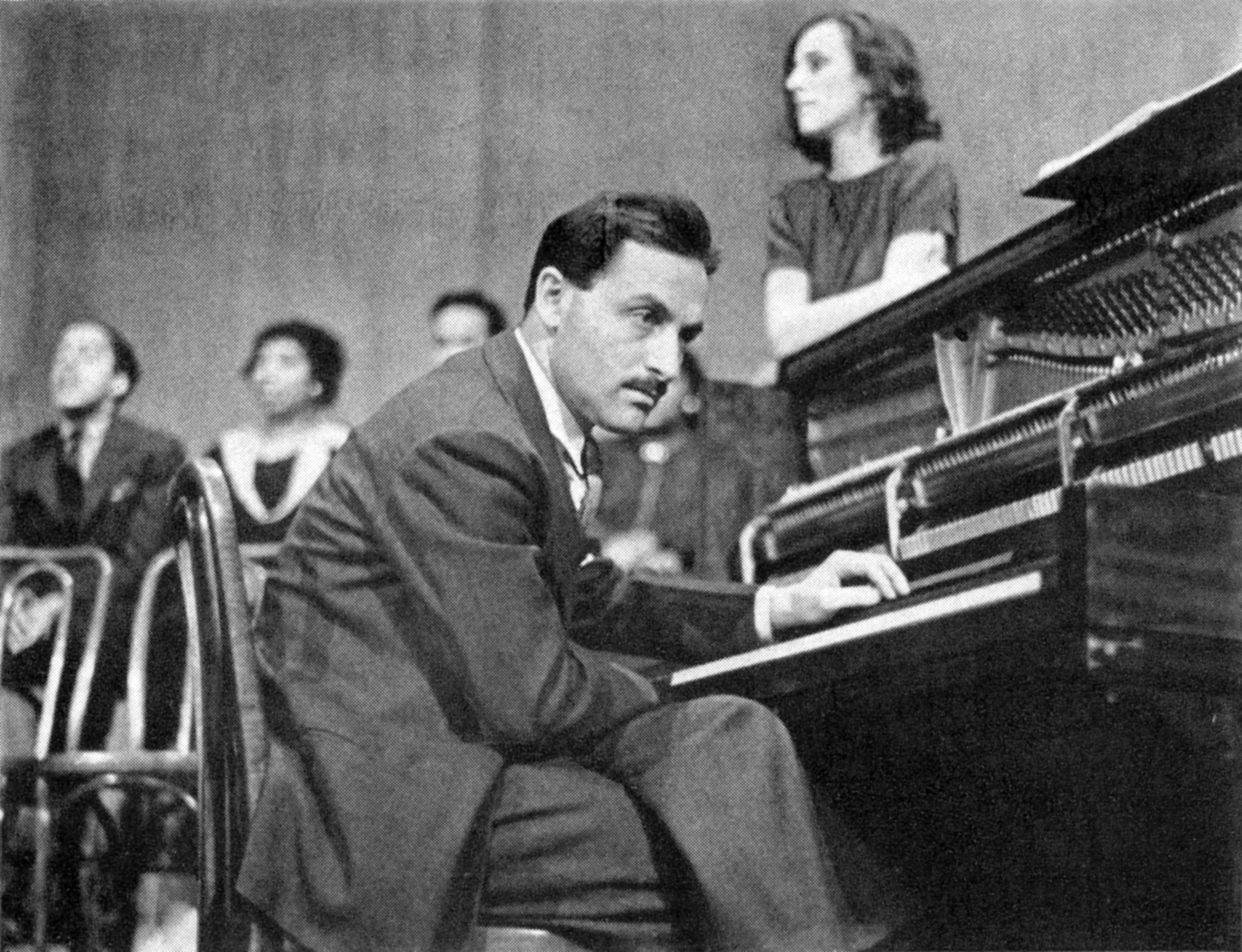
Blitzstein performing the oratorio version of The Cradle Will Rock in a Mercury Theatre presentation (January 1938)

Blitzstein was born in Philadelphia on March 2, 1905. His father descended from a family of Jewish bankers. Blitzstein's musical gifts were apparent at an early age; he had performed a Mozart piano concerto by the time he was seven. He went on to study piano with Alexander Siloti (a pupil of Tchaikovsky and Liszt), and made his professional concerto debut with the Philadelphia Orchestra in Liszt's E-flat Piano Concerto when he was 21.

After studying composition at the Curtis Institute of Music, he went to Europe to continue his studies in Berlin with Arnold Schoenberg (with whom he did not get on), and in Paris with Nadia Boulanger (with whom he did). Back in New York, he connected to the Composers Collective - with members as Aaron Copland and Hanns Eisler - known for their left-leaning political viewpoints. Despite his later political beliefs, he was, in the early years of his career, a self-proclaimed and unrepentant artistic snob, who firmly believed that true art was only for the intellectual elite. He was vociferous in denouncing composers – in particular Respighi, Ravel, and Kurt Weill – who, he felt, debased their standards to reach a wider public.

His works of this period, mostly pianistic vehicles such as the Piano Sonata (1927) and the Piano Concerto (1931) are typical of the Boulanger-influenced products of American modernism – strongly rhythmic (though not influenced by jazz) and described by himself as "wild, dissonant and percussive." These early works were far removed from the Schoenberg style.

The dramatic premiere of the pro-union The Cradle Will Rock took place at the Venice Theater on June 16, 1937. The cast had been locked out of the Maxine Elliott Theatre by the Works Progress Administration, the government agency which had originally funded the production, so the cast and musicians walked with the audience to the nearby Venice. There, without costumes or sets, they performed the work concert-style, actors and musicians alike, sitting among the audience (to evade union restrictions on their performance) with Blitzstein narrating from the piano. In 1939, Leonard Bernstein led a revival of the play at Harvard, narrating from the piano just as Blitzstein had done. Blitzstein attended the performance, after which he and Bernstein became close friends; Bernstein would later say that Blitzstein's contribution to the American musical theatre was "incalculable". The 1999 film Cradle Will Rock was based on this event, though heavily embellished. In the film, Blitzstein (played by Hank Azaria) is portrayed as gaining inspiration through ghostly appearances by his idol Brecht and his late anorexic wife.

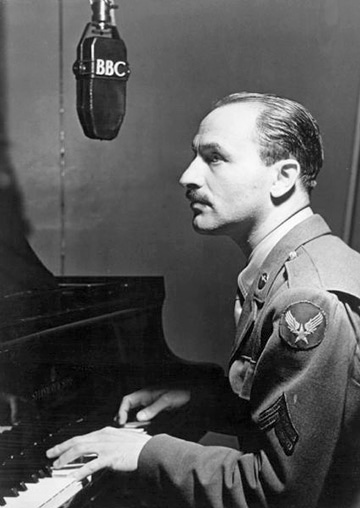
Blitzstein in U.S. Army Air Corps uniform (London 1943)

Additional major compositions include the autobiographical radio song play I've Got the Tune, The Airborne Symphony (1946), Regina (1949), Reuben, Reuben (1955), and Juno (1959). At the time of his death, Blitzstein was at work on Idiots First, a one-act opera based on the eponymous story by Bernard Malamud – intended to be part of a set of one-acters called Tales of Malamud – which Ned Rorem has called "his best work". This was followed by the work, Blitzstein intended to be his magnum opus, a three-act opera commissioned by the Ford Foundation and optioned by the Metropolitan Opera entitled Sacco and Vanzetti. Both Tales of Malamud and Sacco and Vanzetti were completed posthumously, with the approval of Blitzstein's estate, by composer Leonard Lehrman. Lehrman completed his long-awaited Marc Blitzstein: A Bio-Bibliography published in 2005 by Praeger.

During World War II, Blitzstein served as a sergeant in the U.S. Army, attached to the Office of War Information. In 1945, he was one of 16 Army officers and enlisted men singled out as alleged Communists by the House Committee on Military Affairs. General "Wild Bill" Donovan came to their defense, citing their loyalty and effectiveness. In 1958, Blitzstein was subpoenaed to appear before the U.S. House Committee on Un-American Activities (HUAC). Appearing first in a closed session, Blitzstein admitted his membership in the Communist Party (ending in 1949) and, challenging the right of HUAC to question him at all, refused to name names or cooperate any further. He was recalled for a further public session, but after a day sitting anxiously in a waiting room he was not called to testify.

During a visit to Martinique in 1964, at the age of 58, Blitzstein was murdered by three sailors he had picked up in a bar, one of whom he was said to have propositioned. He is buried at Chelten Hills Cemetery in Philadelphia.

== Personal life and family ==
Blitzstein was openly gay. He wrote to his sister in 1929, regarding prior attempts to suppress or hide his orientation, "it is absurd to assume there are no sins; there are definitely Cardinal sins -- sins against oneself, against one's law. My sin is, has been... the willingness to corrupt my nature." His first lover was the conductor Alexander Smallens, with whom he traveled to Europe in 1924. Blitzstein nevertheless married novelist Eva Goldbeck on March 2, 1933. They had no children. His mother-in-law was Berlin-born musical star and opera singer Lina Abarbanell. He dedicated a number of works, including Romantic Piece for Orchestra (1930), String Quartet, 'The Italian' (1930), the ballet Cain (1930), and the Serenade for String Quartet (1932) to his wife-to-be. She died of anorexia in 1936, and his grief prompted him to throw himself into the work of creating The Cradle Will Rock.

== Selected works ==
- Triple-Sec (1928)
- Parabola And Circula (1930; first performed 2025)
- Garrick Gaieties (1930) – revue – contributing composer (revival of Triple-Sec)
- The Harpies, opera (1931)
- The Condemned (1932, unproduced)
- Parade (1935) – revue – featured songwriter
- The Spanish Earth (1937) – composer with Virgil Thomson
- Caesar (1937) – play revival – incidental music composer
- Pins and Needles (1937) – revue – contributing bookwriter
- The Cradle Will Rock (1937) – musical – composer, lyricist, bookwriter, director, pianist, and actor in the roles of Clerk, First Reporter, and Professor Mamie
- Danton's Death (1938) – play revival – incidental music composer
- I've Got the Tune (1938) – radio opera
- No for an Answer (1941)
- Native Land (1942)
- The Airborne Symphony (1946) – symphony – composer
- Another Part of the Forest (1946) – play – incidental music composer
- Androcles and the Lion (1946) – play revival – incidental music composer
- Regina (1949) – opera – composer and orchestrator, librettist
- Let's Make an Opera (1950) – special performance – director
- King Lear (1950) – play revival – incidental music composer
- The Threepenny Opera (1954) – operetta revival – editor of Bertolt Brecht's book and lyrics into English
- Reuben, Reuben (1955) – opera
- Juno (1959) – musical – composer, lyricist and co-orchestrator
- Toys in the Attic (1960) – play – featured songwriter for "French Lessons in Songs" and "Bernier Day"
- Tales of Malamud (two one-act operas): Idiots First (1963, unfinished, completed by Leonard Lehrman, 1973) and The Magic Barrel (1964, unfinished)
- Sacco and Vanzetti (1964, unfinished opera, completed by Leonard Lehrman, 2001)

== Sources ==
- John Warrack and Ewan West (1992), The Oxford Dictionary of Opera. ISBN 0-19-869164-5
- Eric A. Gordon (1989), Mark the Music: The Life and Work of Marc Blitzstein. New York: St. Martin's Press. Reprinted: New York: iUniverse, 2000. ISBN 0-595-09248-9
