= Revolt of the Beavers =

Play by Oscar Saul and Louis Lantz

WPA poster for the play

Revolt of the Beavers was a children's play put on by the Federal Theater Project by Oscar Saul and Louis Lantz. It was originally directed by Peter Hyun, but he was replaced when his actors refused to go Broadway with him, insisting on a name director. One critic described the play as "Marxism à la Mother Goose". The show ran at the Adelphi Theatre in New York City from May 20, 1937, to June 19 of that year. Jules Dassin and John Randolph were among the play's cast. The play involved a worker beaver named Oakleaf, who leads a revolt against "The Chief" Beaver who was exploiting the workers. Though the play was a fantasy fable intended for children, it was attacked by the HUAC for promoting Communist ideals.

Revolt of the Beavers is one of the plays that actor/director Tim Robbins featured in Cradle Will Rock, a 1999 film about the production of the play The Cradle Will Rock.
