= Cradle Will Rock =

1999 American historical drama film

- Theatrical release poster
- Directed by: Tim Robbins
- Written by: Tim Robbins
- Based on: Events surrounding The Cradle Will Rock by Marc Blitzstein
- Produced by: Jon Kilik; Lydia Dean Pilcher; Tim Robbins
- Starring: Hank Azaria; Rubén Blades; Joan Cusack; John Cusack; Cary Elwes; Philip Baker Hall; Cherry Jones; Angus Macfadyen; Bill Murray; Vanessa Redgrave; Susan Sarandon; John Turturro; Emily Watson
- Cinematography: Jean Yves Escoffier
- Edited by: Geraldine Peroni
- Music by: David Robbins
- Production company: Touchstone Pictures
- Distributed by: Buena Vista Pictures Distribution (United States); Filmauro (Italy)
- Release date: December 10, 1999
- Running time: 132 minutes
- Countries: United States; Italy
- Languages: English; Italian
- Budget: $36 million
- Box office: $2.9 million

Cradle Will Rock is a 1999 American historical drama film written, produced and directed by Tim Robbins. The story fictionalizes the true events that surrounded the development of the 1937 musical The Cradle Will Rock by Marc Blitzstein; it adapts history to create an account of the original production, bringing in other stories of the time to produce a social commentary on the role of art and power in the 1930s, particularly amidst the struggles of the labor movement at the time and the corresponding appeal of socialism and communism among many intellectuals, artists and working-class people in the same period.

The film is not based on Orson Welles's unproduced screenplay for The Cradle Will Rock, an autobiographical drama about the production of Blitzstein's musical. Written in 1984, a year before Welles's death, the script was published in 1994; the film has not been produced.

== Plot ==
At the height of the Great Depression, the Federal Theatre Project, led by Hallie Flanagan, brings low-cost theater to millions across the United States. FTP and other projects of the Works Progress Administration face anti-communist criticism and increasing government pressure led by the new House Committee on Un-American Activities.

In New York City, playwright Marc Blitzstein is working on his new musical, The Cradle Will Rock, but lacks the inspiration to finish it. While attending a public protest, he is visited by two imaginary figures representing his late wife and the famed German playwright Bertolt Brecht. They encourage him to make the play more relevant to the times rather than an abstract concept. He eventually finishes the play, and it is greenlit by Flanagan as an FTP production and attached to director Orson Welles and producer John Houseman.

Anti-communist FTP clerk Hazel Huffman convenes a meeting of like-minded WPA employees. Tommy Crickshaw, a ventriloquist with FTP's vaudeville project who resents his assignment to train the untalented duo Sid and Larry, attends the meeting and finds himself attracted to Hazel. Although they grow closer while rehearsing the alarmist testimony Hazel hopes to give to HUAC, Hazel rejects Tommy's advances. Depressed, he oversleeps and wakes to find Sid and Larry performing his routine. Hazel is later called to testify before HUAC, prompting her coworkers to shun her.

Margherita Sarfatti, an envoy of Benito Mussolini's government, visits New York to gain support from American industrialists for Mussolini's war effort. Among her connections are William Randolph Hearst, Nelson Rockefeller, and steel magnate Gray Mathers, whose pro-fascist dealings create tension with his wife, Constance, an enthusiastic patron of the arts and friend of Houseman. Sarfatti connects Rockefeller with Diego Rivera, who is commissioned to paint a mural in the lobby of Rockefeller Center. However, Rivera soon clashes with both Rockefeller and Sarfatti over the mural's communist themes, especially its depiction of Vladimir Lenin.

Following Hazel's HUAC testimony, the WPA faces the threat of losing its budget. Although Flanagan appears before HUAC to give a passionate defense of FTP, the project is forced to cut funding for all FTP productions, lay off thousands of workers, and order all ongoing projects to cease their activities, including The Cradle Will Rock. A now-unemployed Tommy performs a set portraying his ventriloquist dummy as a Communist, before walking off the stage and leaving the dummy behind.

The Cradle Will Rock's opening is cancelled in the wake of the FTP cutbacks, as the actors' union refuses to let them perform without federal approval. Rather than give in to defeat, Welles and Houseman (assisted by a gleeful Constance) set up an improvised performance in a shuttered theater, with Blitzstein as both cast and orchestra. Male lead Aldo Silvano, who struggles to support his family after breaking with his well-to-do parents over their fascist sympathies, reluctantly goes along with the union's decision to avoid losing his job; female lead Olive Stanton must choose between the show and her live-in relationship with successful costar John Adair.

As Blitzstein begins the first song of the performance, the other actors, including Aldo and a now-homeless Olive, suddenly appear in the audience and perform the entire play without setting foot on the stage. As the show ends, the cast and audience break into celebration. Simultaneously, workers destroy Rivera's mural; Tommy shares a bittersweet embrace with a tearful Hazel in his dressing room; and a group of former FTP performers stage a mock funeral procession of Crickshaw's dummy (renamed "Federal Theatre Project"). The procession ends in present-day Times Square, which is lined with billboards advertising Broadway plays.

== Cast ==
The film has a large ensemble cast of interconnected characters, including both historical and fictional figures.

- Hank Azaria as Marc Blitzstein
- Jack Black as Sid
- Rubén Blades as Diego Rivera
- John Carpenter as William Randolph Hearst
- Corina Katt Ayala as Frida Kahlo
- Joan Cusack as Hazel Huffman
- John Cusack as Nelson Rockefeller
- Cary Elwes as John Houseman
- Kyle Gass as Larry
- Paul Giamatti as Carlo, an aspiring opera singer under Constance's patronage
- Philip Baker Hall as Gray Mathers
- Cherry Jones as Hallie Flanagan
- Angus Macfadyen as Orson Welles
- Bill Murray as Tommy Crickshaw
- Vanessa Redgrave as Countess Constance LaGrange
- Gil Robbins as Congressman Joe Starnes, a HUAC member
- Susan Sarandon as Margherita Sarfatti
- Jamey Sheridan as John Adair
- Barbara Sukowa as Sophie Silvano
- John Turturro as Aldo Silvano (based on Howard da Silva, the real-life actor who originated the role of Larry Foreman)
- Emily Watson as Olive Stanton
- Harris Yulin as Congressman Martin Dies, HUAC chairman

Bob Balaban portrays WPA Administrator Harry Hopkins. Daniel Jenkins portrays Will Geer, a real member of The Cradle Will Rock's original cast (although in the film Geer plays the Druggist, while the real-life Geer originated the role of Mr. Mister). Audra McDonald, Erin Hill, Victoria Clark, and Barnard Hughes also appear as Federal Theatre Project performers cast in The Cradle Will Rock. Sarah Hyland plays Aldo's daughter Giovanna, while Lynn Cohen and Dominic Chianese play Aldo's parents; Peter Jacobson appears as an uncle who antagonizes Aldo. Gretchen Mol appears as Marion Davies.

== Historical context and production ==
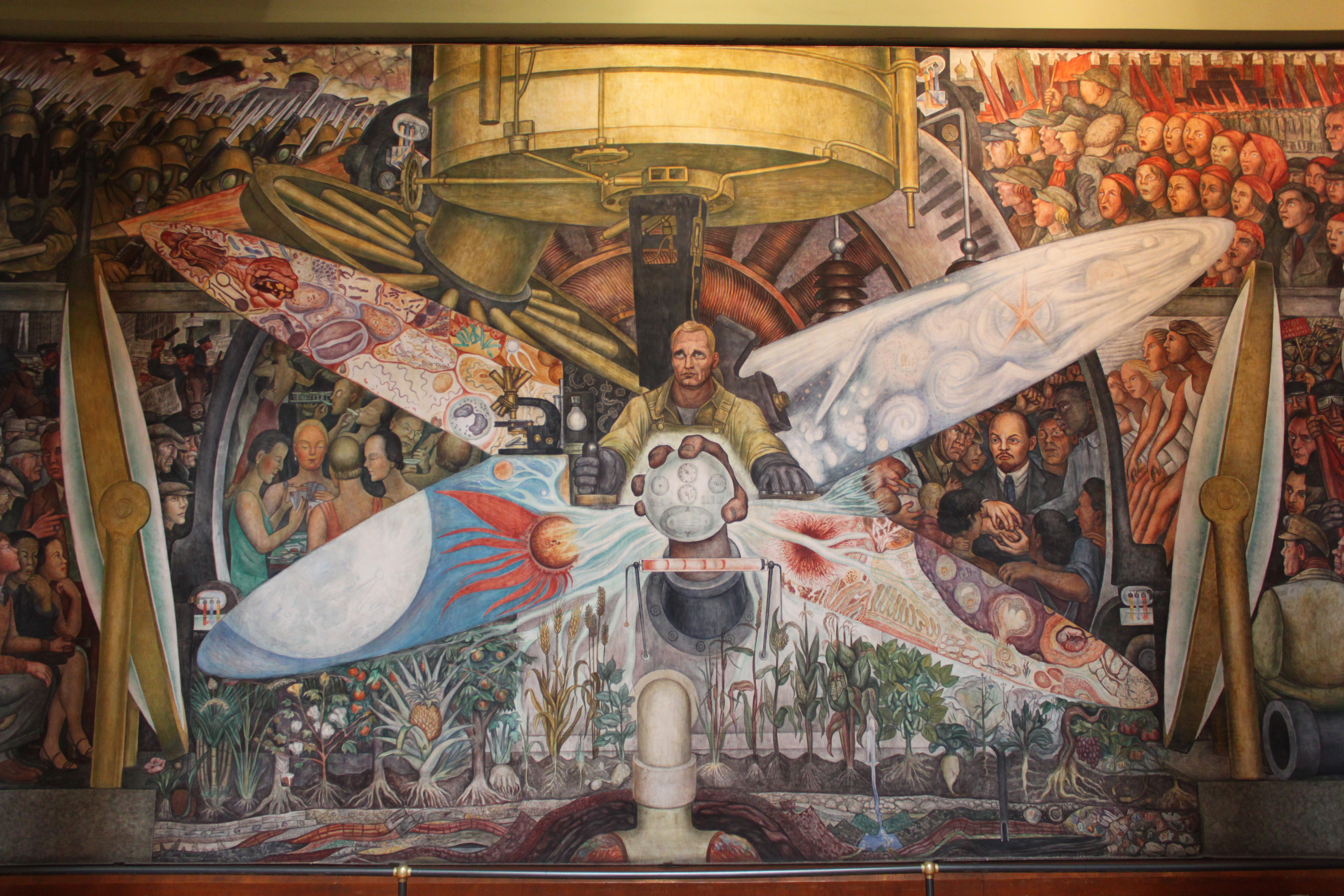
Man at the Crossroads (1933), the real mural painted by Diego Rivera, which inspired the depiction in the film.

This film takes place in the 1930s during the Great Depression. The film takes some narrative license and presents certain events as simultaneous, when they really occurred at different times. Some examples of this are the addition and subsequent destruction of Rivera's Man at the Crossroads in the RCA Building (1933–34), the Italian invasion of Ethiopia (1935), labor strikes against Little Steel (1937) and the Dies Committee's assault on the Federal Theatre Project (1938) (Weales 2000).

Program from a production of The Cradle Will Rock by the Federal Theater Project

In telling the story of The Cradle Will Rock—a leftist labor musical that was sponsored by the Federal Theatre Project (FTP) only to be banned after the WPA cut the project and diverted its funds elsewhere—Robbins is able to tie in issues such as labor unrest, repression by the House Committee on Un-American Activities, and the role and value of art in such a tumultuous time.

The film was released in conjunction with a book that Robbins put together to provide a deeper look into the film's time period. The book includes the film's script, which is accompanied by essays and pictures describing the people, events, and themes that are the basis for the film.

The 1937 children's play Revolt of the Beavers by playwright/screenwriter Oscar Saul (who would later do the screenplay for the 1951 film A Streetcar Named Desire) was also featured in this film. It, too, was under scrutiny from the HUAC for promoting a communistic ideal of equal work and equal rewards. In the film, it was valiantly defended by the head of the FTP, Hallie Flanagan, and the play ran for approximately one month at the Adelphi Theater in New York.

== Reception ==
Cradle Will Rock was met with mostly positive reviews. On review aggregator website Rotten Tomatoes, the film holds an approval rating of 65%, based on 74 reviews, and an average rating of 6.3/10. The site's consensus states: "Witty and provocative." On Metacritic, the film has a weighted average score of 64 out of 100, based on 31 critics, indicating "generally favorable" reviews.

While the original production of The Cradle Will Rock was stated to be "The most exciting evening of theater this New York generation has seen" (MacLeish, Cole 2000), some critics did not feel the same about Robbins' reproduction of the event for film. Although it was nominated for the Palme d'Or at the 1999 Cannes Film Festival, among other festivals, and some have praised the film as an astute commentary on censorship and the lines between art and life (Cole 2000), others have criticized the piece for attempting to bring too many themes together into one story, and thus losing the power of the original context altogether (Alleva 2000; Weales 2000).
