= Peter Hyun =

American director and writer (1906–1993)

Peter Hyun (August 15, 1906 – August 25, 1993) was an American director and writer. He was the director at the Federal Theater Project of New York. His play Revolt of the Beavers became the first production of the Works Progress Administration to premiere on Broadway. If not for the actors refusing to debut Revolt of the Beavers with him as the director, he would have been the first Asian American director of a Broadway play. He published two autobiographies Man Sei! The Making of a Korean American and In the New World: The Making of a Korean American.

== Early life ==
Peter Hyun was born August 15, 1906, in Lihue, Hawaii, a son of Soon Hyun, a Methodist minister. He grew up in Korea and also spent time in the French Quarter of Shanghai before returning to Honolulu, Hawaii. He studied at DePauw University where he intended to major in religion, but he dropped out of college to pursue theater.

== Career ==
In 1930, Hyun became the assistant stage manager for the Civic Repertory Theater in New York, alongside such future luminaries as John Garfield, Burgess Meredith, and Howard Da Silva. In 1931, he created his own theater group, the Studio Players, in Cambridge, Massachusetts, and led them through a critically acclaimed season before walking away from the Studio Players. For the next five years, Peter directed socialist plays, children's plays, and marionette shows in New York, California, and Quebec.

In 1935, he began working with the Federal Theater Project of New York where he found success with children's productions of The Emperor's New Clothes and a marionette production of Ferdinand the Bull. In 1937, he directed Revolt of the Beavers, a play about beavers who go on strike after being terrorized by police beavers. It was the first Works Progress Administration production to debut on Broadway. However, the actors refused to go to Broadway with Peter as the director due to his race, and Hyun stepped aside for another director to take charge.

After leaving theater, Peter returned to Hawaii and in 1944 joined the U.S. Army because of his ability to speak Korean, Japanese, Chinese, and Tagalog. He became a major in the Asian Languages Intelligence Section.

In 1986, he published his first autobiography Man Sei! The Making of a Korean American which focuses on his family's flight from Japanese-occupied Korea to China. On August 25, 1993, he died from cancer in Oxnard, CA. His second autobiography, In the New World: The Making of a Korean American, was published posthumously in 1995. It focused on the discrimination and racism he faced in America.

== Works ==
Man Sei! The Making of a Korean American. Honolulu: University of Hawaii Press, 1986

In the New World: The Making of a Korean American. Honolulu: University of Hawaii Press, 1995
