= Adelphi Theatre (New York City) =

Former theatre in Manhattan, New York

Coordinates: 40°45′45″N 73°58′46″W

General information
- Location: 152 West 54th Street, Manhattan, New York, United States
- Opened: 1928
- Closed: 1970
- Demolished: 1970

The Adelphi Theatre (originally the Craig Theatre) was a Broadway theater at 152 West 54th Street in Midtown Manhattan, New York City, with 1,434 seats. Opened on December 24, 1928, the theater was taken over by the Federal Theater Project in 1934 and renamed the Adelphi. The theater was renamed the Radiant Center by The Royal Fraternity of Master Metaphysicians in 1940. It was then the Yiddish Arts Theater (1943), and renamed the Adelphi Theater on April 20, 1944, when it was acquired by The Shubert Organization.

It became a DuMont Television Network studio, known as the Adelphi Tele-Theatre in the 1950s. The "Classic 39" episodes of The Honeymooners were filmed in this facility by DuMont using their Electronicam system for broadcast on CBS later during the 1955–56 television season. The theater returned to legitimate use in 1957, was renamed the 54th Street Theater in 1958, and finally the George Abbott Theater in 1965. The theatre was torn down in 1970. In 1989, an office tower, 1325 Avenue of the Americas, was built on the site. The tower is connected to the New York Hilton Midtown hotel by a walkway and uses the Hilton's Sixth Avenue address even though it is mid-block and closer to Seventh Avenue.

Some interiors were decorated with murals painted by Joseph Mortimer Lichtenauer. The artistic cycle was dismembered after its demolition.

== Notable productions ==
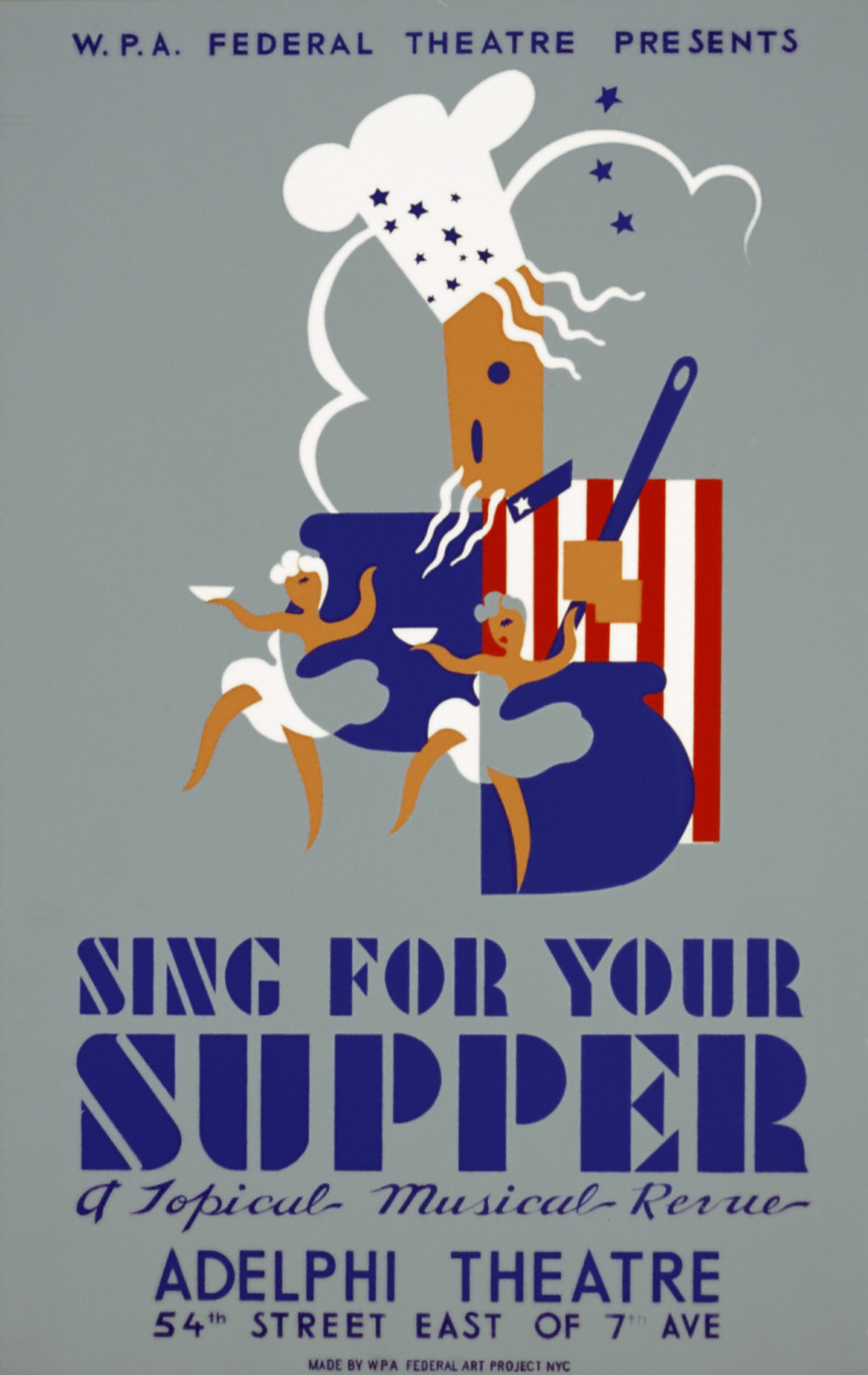
Poster by Aida McKenzie for Federal Theatre Project presentation of Sing for Your Supper at the Adelphi Theatre. (between 1936 and 1939)

- Revolt of the Beavers (May 20, 1937 – June 19, 1937)
- Sing for Your Supper (April 24, 1939 – June 30, 1939)
- On the Town (December 28, 1944 – February 6, 1945)
- Around the World (May 31, 1946 – August 3, 1946)
- Street Scene (January 1, 1947 – May 17, 1947)
- Life Is Worth Living
- The Honeymooners (October 1, 1955 – September 22, 1956)
- Damn Yankees (May 6, 1957 – December 10, 1957)
- Bye Bye Birdie (October 24, 1960 – January 14, 1961)
- 13 Daughters (March 1, 1961 – March 25, 1961)
- No Strings (March 15, 1962 – September 29, 1962)
- What Makes Sammy Run? (February 27, 1964 – December 6, 1965)
- Any Wednesday (February 15, 1966 – June 26, 1966)
- Wait Until Dark (October 3, 1966 – November 26, 1966)
- Darling of the Day (January 27, 1968 – February 24, 1968)
- Gantry (February 14, 1970)

Musical theater star William Gaxton referred to it as "the dump of dumps".
