= American Writers: A Journey Through History =

Television series produced and broadcast by C-SPAN

- Country of origin: United States
- Original language: English
- No. of episodes: 39

Production
- Executive producer: Mark Farkas

Original release
- Network: C-SPAN
- Release: March 19, 2001 – July 7, 2002

Related
- American Presidents: Life Portraits

American Writers: A Journey Through History is a series produced and broadcast by C-SPAN in 2001 and 2002 that profiled selected American writers and their times. Each program was a two- to three-hour look at the life and times of one or more significant American writer. Episodes were broadcast from locations of importance to the profiled writer(s) and featured interviews with historians and other experts. The series had an overall budget of $4,500,000. The first program aired on March 19, 2001, and focused on William Bradford and the Mayflower Compact.

== Style ==
As is the case with many C-SPAN programs, it aired live and heavily incorporated calls from viewers:

"It's not perfectly packaged and beautifully produced," said Susan Swain, executive vice president of C-Span. "There isn't a narrator who weaves it together. It's a bit unpredictable. I don't know what my guests are going to say."

== History of the show ==
Originally, the series was scheduled to air entirely in 2001, and it followed that schedule up to a profile of Will Rogers that aired on September 10, 2001. However, following the 9/11 attacks, C-SPAN management determined that the network needed to focus on events related to the attacks, and the subsequent programs were put on hold until March 2002. When originally planned, the profile of H. L. Mencken of Baltimore was scheduled to follow that of Will Rogers. Instead, C-SPAN producers opted to postpone the Mencken show, and return with one about the Harlem Renaissance, to honor the role of New York City in the 9/11 attacks. The series returned on March 31, 2002, opening with shots of 135th Street in Harlem, and continued through the final profile on July 7, 2002, which was a discussion with Neil Sheehan and David Halberstam at the Vietnam Veterans Memorial. The group of programs aired in 2002 were sometimes referred to as American Writers II: The 20th Century.

As a companion volume to the series, Merriam-Webster published the Dictionary of American Writers in 2001, which contained brief entries on a wide variety of writers, many of whom were not profiled in the series.

== Selection criteria ==
The choice of which writers to profile was (by its very nature) subjective, unlike C-SPAN's similar 1999 series American Presidents: Life Portraits, because there were a fixed number of U.S. presidents but not a fixed number of American writers. For instance, Herman Melville was not profiled. There were also criticisms of the manner in which certain authors were presented, such as Ayn Rand.

The stated criteria for selection were the following:

- "Writers whose works-–whether fiction or non-fiction, document or book–-chronicled, reflected upon, or influenced the course of our nation's history."
- "Works which represent four centuries of American history, from the nation's founding to Vietnam."
- "Writers who are essentially American."
- "Writers whose works continue to be studied."
- "An overall list which offers some demographic, cultural, and political diversity."
- "Works which are generally available to the public."

== Episodes ==
Programs were organized into eight chronological groups, shown below.

Note: In addition to the interviewees listed, each program featured a variety of other experts, many of whom were employed by or volunteered for the historical sites from which the programs were being broadcast.

=== I: Founding to Revolution, 1600–1800 ===
Program #	Original air date with link to video	Featured writer(s)	Featured work(s)	Featured place(s)	Featured interviewees
1	March 19, 2001	William Bradford	Mayflower Compact	Plimoth Plantation, Plymouth, Massachusetts	Peter Gomes
2	March 26, 2001	Benjamin Franklin	Autobiography of Benjamin Franklin	American Philosophical Society, Philadelphia, Pennsylvania	H.W. Brands
3	April 2, 2001	Thomas Paine	Common Sense	Thomas Paine Memorial Cottage, New Rochelle, New York	Eric Foner
4	April 9, 2001	Thomas Jefferson	Declaration of Independence	Montpelier, Montpelier Station, Virginia	Pauline Maier, Roger Wilkins
4	April 9, 2001	James Madison	U.S. Constitution	Montpelier, Montpelier Station, Virginia	Pauline Maier, Roger Wilkins

=== II: The Young Nation, 1800–1850 ===
Program #	Original air date with link to video	Featured writer(s)	Featured work(s)	Featured place(s)	Featured interviewees
5	April 16, 2001	Meriwether Lewis and William Clark	Journals of the Lewis and Clark Expedition	Fort Clatsop National Memorial, Astoria, Oregon	James P. Ronda, Rex Ziak
6	April 23, 2001	James Fenimore Cooper	The Last of the Mohicans	Fenimore Art Museum, Cooperstown, New York	Alan S. Taylor
7	April 30, 2001	Sojourner Truth	Narrative of Sojourner Truth	The Merritt House, Battle Creek, Michigan	Nell Irvin Painter
8	May 7, 2001	Ralph Waldo Emerson	Nature	Walden Pond, Concord, Massachusetts	Robert D. Richardson
8	May 7, 2001	Henry David Thoreau	Walden	Walden Pond, Concord, Massachusetts	Robert D. Richardson
9	May 14, 2001	Elizabeth Cady Stanton and the Women's rights movement	Declaration of Sentiments	Declaration Park, Seneca Falls, New York	Elisabeth Griffith
10	May 21, 2001	Nathaniel Hawthorne	The Scarlet Letter	Nathaniel Hawthorne Birthplace, Salem, Massachusetts	Brenda Wineapple

=== III: Slavery & the Civil War, 1850–1865 ===
Program #	Original air date with link to video	Featured writer(s)	Featured work(s)	Featured place(s)	Featured interviewees
11	May 28, 2001	Frederick Douglass and the abolitionist Writers	Narrative of the Life of Frederick Douglass	Frederick Douglass National Historic Site, Washington, D.C.	Edna Greene Medford
12	June 4, 2001	Harriet Beecher Stowe	Uncle Tom's Cabin	The Harriet Beecher Stowe House, Cincinnati, Ohio	Joan Hedrick
13	June 11, 2001	Mary Chesnut	A Diary From Dixie	Mulberry Plantation, Camden, South Carolina	Elisabeth Muhlenfeld
14	June 18, 2001	Abraham Lincoln	Gettysburg Address	Gettysburg Battlefield National Park, Gettysburg, Pennsylvania	Harold Holzer

=== IV: Rebuilding America & the Gilded Age, 1865–1901 ===
Program #	Original air date with link to video	Featured writer(s)	Featured work(s)	Featured place(s)	Featured interviewees
15	June 25, 2001	Mark Twain	The Adventures of Huckleberry Finn	Mark Twain Boyhood Home and Museum, Hannibal, Missouri	Roy Blount, Jr.; Shelley Fisher Fishkin
16	July 2, 2001	Willa Cather	O Pioneers!	Willa Cather House, Red Cloud, Nebraska	Richard Norton Smith
17	July 10, 2001	Black Elk	Black Elk Speaks	Little Bighorn Battlefield National Monument, Crow Agency, Montana	Charlotte Black Elk, Paul Andrew Hutton
18	July 16, 2001	Booker T. Washington	Up From Slavery	Tuskegee Institute, Tuskegee, Alabama	David Levering Lewis, Edna Greene Medford
18	July 16, 2001	W.E.B. Du Bois	The Souls of Black Folk	W. E. B. Du Bois Library, University of Massachusetts Amherst, Amherst, Massachusetts	David Levering Lewis, Edna Greene Medford
19	July 23, 2001	Henry Adams	The Education of Henry Adams	Adams National Historical Park, Quincy, Massachusetts	Brooks D. Simpson
20	July 30, 2001	Edith Wharton and the Gilded Age Writers	The Age of Innocence	The Mount, Lenox, Massachusetts	Shari Benstock

=== V: Progressive Era & Reaction, 1901–1929 ===
Program #	Original air date with link to video	Featured writer(s)	Featured work(s)	Featured place(s)	Featured interviewees
21	August 6, 2001	Upton Sinclair and the Muckrakers	The Jungle	Ed Miniat Inc. (near Union Stock Yards), Chicago, Illinois	Dominic Pacyga, Richard Reeves
22	August 13, 2001	Theodore Roosevelt	Winning of the West	Theodore Roosevelt National Park, Medora, North Dakota	H.W. Brands, Tweed Roosevelt
23	August 20, 2001	Theodore Dreiser	Sister Carrie	Chicago Historical Society, Chicago, Illinois	Thomas Riggio
24	September 10, 2001	Will Rogers	The Cowboy Philosopher on Prohibition	Will Rogers Memorial Museum, Claremore, Oklahoma	Steve Granger
25	March 31, 2002	Langston Hughes	Montage of a Dream Deferred	Schomburg Center for Research in Black Culture, Harlem, New York	Ossie Davis, Ruby Dee, Howard Dodson, Jr., Arnold Rampersad, Cheryl Wall
25	March 31, 2002	Zora Neale Huston	Their Eyes Were Watching God	Schomburg Center for Research in Black Culture, Harlem, New York	Ossie Davis, Ruby Dee, Howard Dodson, Jr., Arnold Rampersad, Cheryl Wall
26	April 7, 2002	H. L. Mencken	The American Language	H. L. Mencken House, Baltimore, Maryland	P.J. O'Rourke, Marion Elizabeth Rodgers
27	April 14, 2002	F. Scott Fitzgerald	The Great Gatsby	Summit Avenue, St. Paul, Minnesota	Matthew Bruccoli
28	April 21, 2002	Ernest Hemingway	The Sun Also Rises	Ernest Hemingway Home & Museum, Key West, Florida	Susan Beegel, Linda Patterson Miller

=== VI: Depression & War, 1929–1945 ===
Program #	Original air date with link to video	Featured writer(s)	Featured work(s)	Featured place(s)	Featured interviewees
29	April 28, 2002	John Steinbeck	The Grapes of Wrath	National Steinbeck Center, Salinas, California	Thom Steinbeck, Louis Owens
30	May 5, 2002	William Faulkner and the Southern Writers	The Sound and the Fury	Rowan Oak, Oxford, Mississippi	Shelby Foote, Thadious M. Davis, Donald Kartiganer
31	May 12, 2002	Ayn Rand	The Fountainhead	Harmony Gold Theater; Sunset Boulevard, Hollywood, California	Jeff Britting, Leonard Peikoff
32	May 19, 2002	Ernie Pyle	Here Is Your War	Dana, Indiana	James E. Tobin

=== VII: Early Cold War, 1945–1961 ===
Program #	Original air date with link to video	Featured writer(s)	Featured work(s)	Featured place(s)	Featured interviewees
33	May 26, 2002	Whittaker Chambers	Witness	Cannon House Office Building, Washington, D.C.	Sam Tanenhaus
33	May 26, 2002	Whittaker Chambers	Witness	Whittaker Chambers Farm, Westminster, Maryland	Sam Tanenhaus
34	June 2, 2002	Walter Lippmann	Public Opinion	The Metropolitan Club, Washington, D.C.	Ben Bradlee, Ronald Steel
35	June 9, 2002	Jack Kerouac and the Beat Writers	On the Road	Jack Kerouac Commemorative Park, Lowell, Massachusetts	Douglas Brinkley, David Amram

=== VIII: Social Transformation to Vietnam, 1961–1975 ===
Program #	Original air date with link to video	Featured writer(s)	Featured work(s)	Featured place(s)	Featured interviewees
36	June 16, 2002	James Baldwin	The Fire Next Time	DeWitt Clinton High School, Bronx, New York	Robin D. G. Kelley
37	June 23, 2002	Betty Friedan	The Feminine Mystique	Smith College, Northampton, Massachusetts	Susan Ware
38	June 13, 2002	Russell Kirk	The Conservative Mind	Russell Kirk Center, Mecosta, Michigan	William F. Buckley, Jr., Wilfred M. McClay
38	June 13, 2002	William F. Buckley, Jr.	God and Man at Yale	Russell Kirk Center, Mecosta, Michigan	William F. Buckley, Jr., Wilfred M. McClay
39	July 7, 2002	David Halberstam	The Best and the Brightest	Vietnam Veterans Memorial, Washington, D.C.	David Halberstam, Neil Sheehan
39	July 7, 2002	Neil Sheehan	A Bright Shining Lie	Vietnam Veterans Memorial, Washington, D.C.	David Halberstam, Neil Sheehan
