= Bibliography of Whittaker Chambers =

== Bibliography of writings by Chambers ==
=== Translations ===
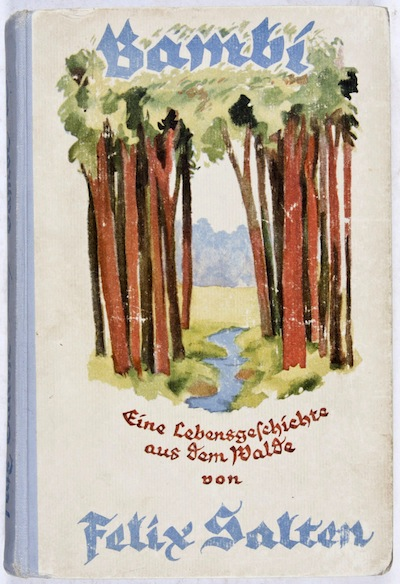
1923 first edition cover of Bambi, which Chambers translated into English in 1928

- Bambi (1928): Bambi. Eine Lebensgeschichte aus dem Walde by Felix Salten. Published by Ullstein Verlag, Austria in 1923. Translated by Whittaker Chambers as Bambi, A Life in the Woods. Published by Simon & Schuster, New York in 1928.
- Complete list of translations 1928-1940

=== Books and plays ===
For the best known work written by Chambers, see separate entry Witness (memoir)

- Chambers, Whittaker (1932). Can You Hear Their Voices?. International Pamphlets.
- Chambers, Whittaker (1952). Witness. Random House. ISBN 0-89526-571-0.
- Saints for Now. Ignatius Press. 1952. ISBN 0-89870-476-6. (includes a Commonweal article by Whittaker Chambers)
- Chambers, Whittaker (1964). Cold Friday. Random House. ISBN 0-394-41969-3.

=== Online ===
- Chambers, Whittaker. "National Review [complete articles]". National Review.
- Chambers, Whittaker (1986). "A Letter to My Children". Heritage Foundation.
- Chambers, Whittaker (2008). "List of Translations by Whittaker Chambers". WhittakerChambers.org.

=== Collections ===
- Chambers, Whittaker (1987). Buckley Jr., William F. (ed.). Odyssey of a Friend: Letters to William F. Buckley Jr. 1954-1961. Regnery Publishing, Inc. ISBN 0-89526-567-2.
- Chambers, Whittaker (1997). de Toledano, Ralph (ed.). Notes from the Underground: The Whittaker Chambers/Ralph de Toledano Letters, 1949-1960. Regnery Publishing, Inc. ISBN 0-89526-425-0.
- Chambers, Whittaker (1989). Teachout, Terry (ed.). Ghosts on the Roof: Selected Journalism of Whittaker Chambers, 1931-1959. Regnery Publishing, Inc. ISBN 0-89526-765-9.
- Chambers, Whittaker (2014). The Whittaker Chambers Reader: His Complete National Review Writings, 1957 to 1959. National Review.

=== Magazine or journal articles ===
==== New Masses ====
- "Can You Make Out Their Voices" (March 1931)
- "You Have Seen the Heads" (April 1931)
- "Our Comrade Munn" (October 1931))
- "The Death of the Communists" (December 1931)

==== Time ====
- "The Ghosts on the Roof" (1945)
- "Books: Problem of the Century" (1946)
- "Religion: In Egypt Land" (1946)
- "Education: The Challenge" (1947)
- "Books: Circles of Perdition" (1947)
- "Religion: Faith for a Lenten Age" (1948)

==== Life ====
- 1947–1948:
  - "The Middle Ages" (April 7, 1947)
  - "Medieval Life" (May 26, 1947)
  - "The Glory of Venice" (August 4, 1947)
  - "The Age of Enlightenment" (September 15, 1947)
  - "The Edwardians" (November 17, 1947)
  - "Age of Exploration" (March 22, 1948)
  - "The Protestant Revolution" (June 14, 1948)
- "The Devil Throughout History," (February 2, 1948)
- "Is Academic Freedom in Danger?" (June 22, 1953)
- "The End of a Dark Age Ushers in New Dangers" (April 30, 1956)

==== Commonweal ====
- "The Sanctity of St. Benedict" (September 19, 1952)

==== National Review ====
- "Big Sister Is Watching You" (December 27, 1957)
- "all National Review articles 1957–1959

=== Collected magazine articles ===
- Chambers, Whittaker. "Time articles by Whittaker Chambers". WhittakerChambers.org.
- Chambers, Whittaker. "National Review articles by Whittaker Chambers". WhittakerChambers.org.

== Other media ==
=== Video on Chambers ===
- "Writings of Whittaker Chambers". American Writers: A Journey Through History. C-SPAN. 2002.
- Chambers, David (2014). "Doubled Links: Whittaker Chambers and the Global Network of Great Illegals, 1932-1935". C-SPAN.
- YouTube.com Red Spy Films. Chambers Farm, Secret Doc. 1948/12/06 (1948) time: 00:00:51
- RAM Whittaker Chambers on "close friends"
- RAM Alger Hiss Story - Chambers on the "tragedy of history"
- RAM Alger Hiss defends himself
- Historical Footage

=== Photos ===
- 1931 Whittaker Chambers
- 1939 Whittaker Chambers
- 1948 Whittaker Chambers before HUAC
- 1950 Whittaker Chambers reading of Hiss guilty verdict
- 1961 Whittaker Chambers near the time of his death

== Hiss–Chambers case ==
=== Books on Hiss case (and Second Red Scare) ===
1. De Toledano, Ralph; Lasky, Victor (1950). Seeds of Treason - The True Story of the Hiss-Chambers Tragedy. Funk and Wagnalls.
2. Cooke, Alistair (1950). A Generation on Trial: USA v. Alger Hiss. Greenwood Press. ISBN 0-313-23373-X.
3. Chambers, Whittaker (1952). Witness. Random House.
4. Morris, Richard Brandon (1952). Fair trial: Fourteen who stood accused from Anne Hutchinson to Alger Hiss. Alfred A. Knopf.
5. Jowitt, William Allen (1953). The Strange Case of Alger Hiss. Hodder and Stoughton.
6. Kempton, Murray (2003) [1955]. Part of Our Time: Some Ruins and Monuments of the Thirties. NYRB Classics. ISBN 1-59017-087-3.
7. Hiss, Alger (1957). In the Court of Public Opinion. Harper Collins. ISBN 0-06-090293-0.
8. Cook, Fred J. (1958). The Unfinished Story of Alger Hiss. William Morrow & Company. ISBN 1-131-85352-0.
9. McHughes, Lee M. (October 1961). "The Hiss Act and Its Application to the Military" (PDF). Military Law Review. Judge Advocate General's School, U.S. Army: 69–108.
10. Andrews, Bert; Andrews, Peter (1962). A Tragedy Of History: A Journalist's Confidential Role In The Hiss-Chambers Case. Robert B. Luce.
11. Packer, Herbert L (1962). Ex-Communist Witnesses: Four Studies in Fact Finding- A Challenging Examination of the Testimony of Whittaker Chambers, Elizabeth Bentley, Louis Budenz, and John Lautner. Stanford University Press.
12. Zeligs, Meyer A. (1967). Friendship and Fratricide: An Analysis of Whittaker Chambers and Alger Hiss. New York Viking Press.
13. Seth, Ronald (1968). The Sleeping Truth: The Hiss-Chambers Affair Reappraised. Frewin. ISBN 0-09-086890-0.
14. Buckley, Jr., William F. (1969). Odyssey of a friend: Whittaker Chambers' Letters to William F. Buckley, Jr., 1954-1961. Putnam.
15. Levine, Isaac Don (1973). Eyewitness to History. Hawthorn Books, Inc. ISBN 1-891936-53-0. Library of Congress Catalog Card No. 72-4919.
16. Smith, John Chabot (1976). Alger Hiss, The True Story. Holt, Rinehart and Winston. ISBN 0-03-013776-4.
17. Hiss, Tony (1977). Laughing last: Alger Hiss. Houghton Mifflin. ISBN 0-395-24899-X.
18. Weinstein, Allen (1978). Perjury: The Hiss-Chambers Case. Random House. ISBN 0-679-77338-X.
19. Levitt, Morton; Levitt, Michael (1979). Tissue of Lies: Nixon vs. Hiss. Random House. ISBN 0-517-37134-0.
20. Theoharis, Athan, ed. (1982). Beyond the Hiss Case: The FBI, Congress, and the Cold War. Temple University Press. ISBN 0-87722-241-X.
21. Reuben, William A (1983). Footnote on an Historic Case: In Re Alger Hiss, No. 78 Civ. 3433. Nation Institute.
22. A Tribute to Whittaker Chambers. Heritage Foundation. 1984.
23. Moore, William Howard (1987). Two Foolish Men: The true story of the friendship between Alger Hiss and Whittaker Chambers. Moorop Press.
24. Hiss, Alger (1989). Recollections of a Life. Little Brown & Co. ISBN 1-55970-024-6.
25. Gwynn, Beatrice (1993). Whittaker Chambers: The Discrepancy in the Evidence of the Typewriter. Mazzard Publishers. ISBN 0-9518738-1-4.
26. Worth, Esme J. (1993). Whittaker Chambers: The Secret Confession. Mazzard Publishers. ISBN 0-9518738-0-6.
27. Walton, Douglas (1995). Arguments from Ignorance. Penn State University Press.
28. Oeste, Bob (1996). Last Pumpkin Paper (novel). Random House. ISBN 0-679-44837-3.
29. Ralph, de Toledano (1997). Notes from the underground: the Whittaker Chambers--Ralph de Toledano letters, 1949-1960. Regnery.
30. Hiss, Tony (1999). The View from Alger's Window: A Son's Memoir. Alfred E. Knopf. ISBN 0-375-40127-X.
31. Olmsted, Kathryn S. (2002). Red Spy Queen: A Biography of Elizabeth Bentley. The University of North Carolina Press. ISBN 0-8078-2739-8.
32. Swan, Patrick, ed. (2003). Alger Hiss, Whittaker Chambers, and the Schism in the American Soul. ISI Books. ISBN 1-882926-91-9.
33. Ruddy, T. Michael (2004). The Alger Hiss Espionage Case. Wadsworth Publishing. ISBN 0-15-508560-3.
34. White, G. Edward (2005). Alger Hiss's Looking-Glass Wars: The Covert Life of a Soviet Spy. Oxford University Press. ISBN 0-19-518255-3.
35. Tanenhaus, Sam (2007). An Un-American Life: The Case of Whittaker Chambers. Old Street Publishing (UK). ISBN 978-1-905847-07-5.
36. Hartshorn, L. (2013). Alger Hiss, Whittaker Chambers and the case that ignited McCarthyism. McFarland.
37. Craig, R. Bruce (2013). The Apprenticeship of Alger Hiss. Now and Then Reader.
38. Storrs, Landon R.Y. (2015). The Second Red Scare and the Unmaking of the New Deal Left. Princeton University Press.
39. Brady, Joan (2017). Alger Hiss: Framed: A New Look at the Case That Made Nixon Famous. Arcade.
40. Snyder, K (2017). The Witness and the President. Kindle Book.
41. White, John Kenneth (2019). Still Seeing Red: How The Cold War Shapes The New American Politics. Routledge.
42. Kisseloff, Jeff (2025). Rewriting Hisstory: A Fifty-Year Journey to Uncover the Truth About Alger Hiss. Kansas University Press.

=== Articles on Hiss case ===
- "Deception and Betrayal: The Tragedy of Alger Hiss" by Donald Hermann (2005)

=== Film on Hiss case ===
- Nixon, 1995, directed by Oliver Stone, (IMDB) - video clips of Whittaker Chambers
- Concealed Enemies, 1984, directed by Jeff Bleckner, (IMDB) - made-for-television movie on the Hiss-Chambers case (pro-Hiss)
- The Trials of Alger Hiss, 1980, (IMDB) - pro-Hiss film (see also The New York Times)
- North by Northwest, 1959, directed by Alfred Hitchcock (IMDB) - reference to the Pumpkin Papers
- Commotion on the Ocean, 1959, Three Stooges (IMDB) - features microfilm in watermelon in reference to the Pumpkin Papers

=== Articles or chapters on Chambers ===
1. Chambers, David (20 March 2007). "Different Legal Risks In Hiss, Libby Cases". The Wall Street Journal.
2. Vidal, Elena Maria (28 April 2011). "History's Witness: His grandson sets the record straight about Whittaker Chambers". The American Conservative.
3. Chambers, David (2012). "The Baffling Harry White". History News Network.

== Chambers and Soviet espionage ==
- Andrew, Christopher; Mitrokhin, Vasili (2000). The Sword and the Shield: The Mitrokhin Archive and the Secret History of the KGB. Basic Books. ISBN 0-465-00312-5.
- Weinstein, Allen; Vassiliev, Alexander (2000). The Haunted Wood: Soviet Espionage in America--The Stalin Era. Modern Library. ISBN 0-375-75536-5.
- Haynes, John Earl; Klehr, Harvey (2003). In Denial: Historians, Communism, and Espionage. Encounter Books. ISBN 1-893554-72-4.
- Haynes, John Earl; Klehr, Harvey (2000). Venona: Decoding Soviet Espionage in America. Yale University Press. ISBN 0-300-08462-5.
- Meier, Andrew (2008). The Lost Spy: An American in Stalin's Secret Service. W. W. Norton. ISBN 978-0-393-06097-3.
- Schecter, Jerrold; Schecter, Leona (2003). Sacred Secrets: How Soviet Intelligence Operations Changed American History. Potomac Books. ISBN 1-57488-522-7.
- Adams, Jefferson (2014). "The Early Days". Strategic Intelligence in the Cold War and Beyond (The Making of the Contemporary World). Routledge. pp. 25–41.

== Novels that include characters based on Chambers ==
- Bacon, Susan (2019). The History Teacher. ISBN 978-1-7330827-0-9.
- Buckley, William F. (1999). The Redhunter: A Novel Based on the Life of Senator Joe McCarthy. Little, Brown. ISBN 0-316-11589-4.
- Oeste, Bob (1996). The Last Pumpkin Paper: A Novel. Random House. ISBN 9780679448372.
- Trilling, Lionel (2002) [1947]. The Middle of the Journey. New York Review of Books Classics Series. ISBN 1-59017-015-6.

== See also ==
- Witness (memoir)
