= Nathaniel Buchwald =

Jewish-American writer and theater critic (1890–1956)

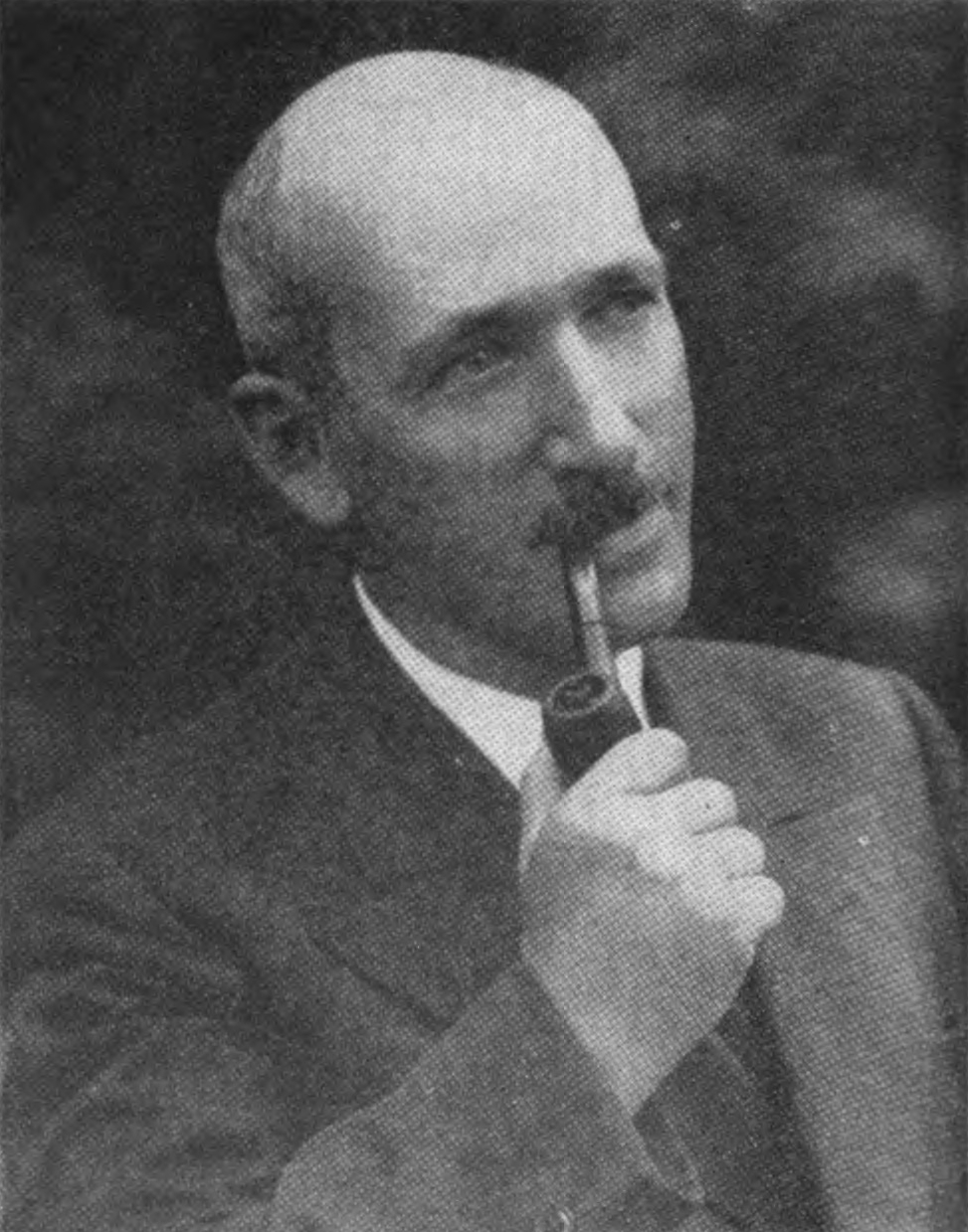
Nathaniel Buchwald

Nathaniel Buchwald (1890–1956) was a 20th-century, left-leaning Jewish-American theater critic, writer, and scholar of Yiddish theater who wrote in Yiddish and English and translated from Yiddish and Russian into English.

== Background ==
Nathaniel Buchwald was born Naftoli Bukhvald on April 14, 1890, in Lublin, Volhynia, Ukraine (then, party of the Russian Empire). He studied at a religious primary school and then a public school. In 1910, Buchwald emigrated to America. He studied at the University of Georgia, Brooklyn Polytechnic Institute, and in 1918 obtained a BS in Chemistry from New York University.

== Career ==
During World War I, Buchwald worked for Forverts (later The Jewish Daily Forward) by translating its editorials from Yiddish into English as required by wartime security regulations regarding foreign-language publications in the US.

Buchwald (front row, third from left) and other staff members of the Morgen Freiheit hold up war bonds they've purchased, September 20, 1943

In the 1920s, Buchwald began publishing articles appeared in Di naye velt (The New World), after which he wrote for this and other Yiddish labor publications. Following the founding of Morgn Frayhayt (Morning Freedom) in New York City in 1922, Buchwald joined its editorial board and contributed as theater critic. Later, he wrote for Jewish Life, also in New York.

In 1925, Buchwald helped found the Artef, a Yiddish theater group in New York City. (The name "Artef" came from Arbeter teater-farband or "workers' theatrical alliance.") Members included: Moyshe Olgin, David Pinski, David Abrams, Melech Marmur, Kalman Marmur, Shachno Epstein, Moyshe Nadir. Regarding Artef's aims, Buchwald wrote: " Life pulled in one direction, to world upheavals, to Revolution, to Soviet Russia, to collective consciousness and collective action, [while] the theatre still busied itself with bygone idylls, Hassidic legends, all kinds of tall tales, or with the routine of bourgeois life, family drama and romantic complication." They staged their first performance in 1927 but slowed during the Great Depression and even took a hiatus from 1937 to 1939. In 1939, the group resumed performances with Clinton Street by Louis Miller. The group disbanded in the 1940.

Up to September 1933, Buchwald served as Moscow correspondent for the publications like the Communist Party USA's official newspaper, the Daily Worker; Vern Smith replaced him.

== Communist allegations ==
During the 1930s, Buchwald came to the attention of the Dies Committee of the US House of Representatives for his contributions to Agitprop theater and again in the 1950s for his theater criticism that appeared in The Daily Worker.

== Personal life and death ==
Buchwald married Stella Buchwald, also a writer.

Buchwald wrote under several pen names including: B. Tulin, B. Brand, N. Poloner, and Bert Toulens (in English).

Buchwald's friends and letter correspondents include Abraham Cahan.

Buchwald died on June 7, 1956, in New York.

== Works ==
Books:

- Folks-bildung in Sovet-Rusland (1925?)
- From peasant to collective farmer (1933)
- Farvos men hot gemishpet di 21 in moskve (Why the twenty-one were sentenced in Moscow) (New York: Idbyuro, 1938)
- Alts--far unzer land Amerike (1942)
- Di dek̜laratsye fun zelbsht̜endigk̜eyt̜ (1943)
- Teater (Theater) (1943)
- Pogromshtshikes farfleytsn amerike, faktn vegn der aynvanderung fun natsis, fashistn un gorgl-shnayder (Pogromists invade America, facts about the immigration of Nazis, fascists, and cut-throats) (1952)
- Omanut ha-teatron (1953)

Translations to Yiddish:

- Alfonz Goldshmidt, Dos lebn un shtrebn in sovet-rusland (Life and aspiration in Soviet Russia) (New York, 1921)
- Anatoly Lunacharsky, Kunst un sotzyalizm (Art and socialism)
- Lenin, Teorye un praktik fun revolutsye (The theory and practice of revolution)
- Rosa Luxemburg, Reform oder revolutsye (Reform or revolution)
- Hallie Flanagan and Margaret Ellen Clifford, Trikenish ("Drought"), translation of Can You Hear Their Voices? a play from a short story by Whittaker Chambers) (1931)
- Der Regnboygn (1944)

Articles:

- "Yiddish", Cambridge History of American Literature (NY: Putnam, 1921)
- "A Visit with 'Tarbut Laam'," Jewish Life (1956)

== External sources ==
- YIVO Archives: Nathaniel Buchwald Translation of Teatr
- Beit Hatfutsot Databases - Buchwald
- Yiddish Song "In dem vaytn land Sibir"
