= American Presidents: Life Portraits =

American television series

- Country of origin: United States
- Original language: English
- No. of seasons: 1
- No. of episodes: 41

Production
- Executive producer: Mark Farkas
- Producers: Paul Brown, Maura Pierce

Original release
- Network: C-SPAN
- Release: March 15 – December 20, 1999

Related
- American Writers: A Journey Through History

American Presidents: Life Portraits is a series produced by C-SPAN in 1999. Each episode was aired live, and was a two- to three-hour look at the life and times of one particular president of the United States. Episodes were broadcast from locations of importance to the profiled president, featured interviews with historians and other experts, and incorporated calls from viewers. The series served as a commemoration of C-SPAN's 20th anniversary.

The first program aired on March 15, 1999, and profiled George Washington. Subsequent programs featured each president in succession, concluding with the then current president Bill Clinton on December 20, 1999. (Despite serving two non-consecutive terms, Grover Cleveland was only profiled on one program.)

== Peabody Award ==
American Presidents was awarded a George Foster Peabody Award in 1999. Excerpts of the official rationale for that award appear below:

...From the sites, noted biographers, presidential scholars, descendants, and other guests presented revealing information and assessments of the life, times and legacies of the presidents. The tone set by chairman and CEO (and reluctant air personality) Brian P. Lamb remains on point: good television often takes time, requires few special effects and demands (and rewards) good listening. While, like Mr. Lamb, they rarely seek the spotlight, especially deserving of mention are executive producer Mark Farkas, producers Maura Pierce, Paul Brown, Peter Slen and the more than 200 other unseen individuals who make the C-SPAN service increasingly indispensable...

...For creating a series that perfectly embodies the essence of public service in electronic communications, a Peabody Award is presented to C-SPAN for "American Presidents: Life Portraits."

== Presidential portraits ==
Artist Chas Fagan was commissioned by C-SPAN to paint portraits of each of the 41 men who had held the office of U.S. president through 1999. He was given a 90-day window from the time he agreed to the assignment until the time that the project needed to be complete. In September 1999, Union Station in Washington, D.C., hosted a display of Fagan's presidential portraits. Since then, Fagan has also painted portraits of George W. Bush, Barack Obama, and Donald Trump, and tours with exhibits of those portraits.

== Programs ==
Note: In addition to the interviewees listed, each program featured a variety of other experts, many of whom were employed by or volunteered for the historical sites from which the programs were being broadcast.

Original air date with link to video	President	Location	Featured interviewees
March 15, 1999	George Washington	Mount Vernon Estate and Gardens, Alexandria, Virginia	Richard Norton Smith
March 22, 1999	John Adams	Adams National Historic Site, Quincy, Massachusetts	David McCullough
April 2, 1999	Thomas Jefferson	Monticello, Charlottesville, Virginia	Andrew Burstein, Annette Gordon-Reed
April 9, 1999	James Madison	Montpelier, Montpelier Station, Virginia	Jack Rakove, Holly Shulman
April 12, 1999	James Monroe	James Monroe Museum, Fredericksburg, Virginia	
April 18, 1999	John Quincy Adams	Massachusetts Historical Society, Boston, Massachusetts	Lynn Hudson Parsons
April 26, 1999	Andrew Jackson	The Hermitage, Hermitage, Tennessee	Robert Remini
May 3, 1999	Martin Van Buren	Martin Van Buren National Historic Site, Kinderhook, New York	
May 10, 1999	William Henry Harrison	Tippecanoe Battlefield, Battle Ground, Indiana	
May 17, 1999	John Tyler	Sherwood Forest Plantation, Charles City, Virginia	Edward Crapol, Harrison Ruffin Tyler
May 28, 1999	James K. Polk	President James K. Polk Home & Museum, Columbia, Tennessee	
May 31, 1999	Zachary Taylor	Zachary Taylor National Cemetery, Louisville, Kentucky	
June 11, 1999	Millard Fillmore	Fillmore House Museum, East Aurora, New York	
June 14, 1999	Franklin Pierce	The Pierce Manse, Concord, New Hampshire	Barry Paris
June 21, 1999	James Buchanan	Wheatland, Lancaster, Pennsylvania	
June 28, 1999	Abraham Lincoln	Lincoln Home National Historic Site, Springfield, Illinois	
July 9, 1999	Andrew Johnson	Andrew Johnson National Historic Site, Greeneville, Tennessee	
July 12, 1999	Ulysses S. Grant	General Grant National Memorial, New York City, New York	John Y. Simon, Allan Ballard, Ulysses Grant Dietz
July 19, 1999	Rutherford B. Hayes	Rutherford B. Hayes Presidential Center, Spiegel Grove, Fremont, Ohio	Ari Hoogenboom
July 26, 1999	James A. Garfield	James A. Garfield National Historic Site, Mentor, Ohio	
August 6, 1999	Chester A. Arthur	Union College, Schenectady, New York	Thomas C. Reeves
August 13, 1999	Grover Cleveland	Grover Cleveland Birthplace, Caldwell, New Jersey	
August 20, 1999	Benjamin Harrison	President Benjamin Harrison Home, Indianapolis, Indiana	
August 23, 1999	William McKinley	McKinley National Memorial and Museum, Canton, Ohio	
September 3, 1999	Theodore Roosevelt	Sagamore Hill National Historic Site, Oyster Bay, New York	Edmund Morris, Sylvia Jukes Morris
September 6, 1999	William Howard Taft	William Howard Taft National Historic Site, Cincinnati, Ohio	David H. Burton
September 13, 1999	Woodrow Wilson	Woodrow Wilson Birthplace and Museum, Staunton, Virginia	John Milton Cooper, Jr., Nell Irvin Painter
September 20, 1999	Warren G. Harding	President Harding's Home, Marion, Ohio	Robert Ferrell, Eugene Trani
September 27, 1999	Calvin Coolidge	President Calvin Coolidge State Historic Site, Plymouth, Vermont	
October 4, 1999	Herbert Hoover	Herbert Hoover Presidential Library and Museum and Herbert Hoover National Historic Site, West Branch, Iowa	Richard Norton Smith
October 11, 1999	Franklin D. Roosevelt	Home of Franklin D. Roosevelt National Historic Site and Franklin D. Roosevelt Presidential Library and Museum, Hyde Park, New York	David Kennedy, Hugh Gregory Gallagher, Allida Black
October 18, 1999	Harry S. Truman	Harry S. Truman Presidential Library and Museum, Independence, Missouri	Alonzo Hamby, Margaret Truman Daniel
October 25, 1999	Dwight D. Eisenhower	Dwight D. Eisenhower Center, Abilene, Kansas	Geoffrey Perret
November 5, 1999	John F. Kennedy	John F. Kennedy National Historic Site, Brookline, Massachusetts	Robert Dallek, Thomas C. Reeves
November 12, 1999	Lyndon B. Johnson	LBJ Ranch, Stonewall, Texas	Joseph Califano, Robert Caro
November 19, 1999	Richard Nixon	Richard M. Nixon Library and birthplace, Yorba Linda, California	Melvin Small, Joan Hoff
November 22, 1999	Gerald Ford	Gerald R. Ford Presidential Museum, Grand Rapids, Michigan	James M. Cannon, Richard Norton Smith
December 3, 1999	Jimmy Carter	Jimmy Carter National Historic Site, Plains, Georgia	Douglas Brinkley, Leo Ribuffo
December 6, 1999	Ronald Reagan	Ronald Reagan ranch, Santa Barbara, California	Lou Cannon
December 13, 1999	George H. W. Bush	George Bush Presidential Library, College Station, Texas	John Robert Greene
December 20, 1999	Bill Clinton	Clinton Center and Birthplace, Hope, Arkansas	David Maraniss
