= God and Man at Yale =

1951 book

- Cover of the first edition
- Author: William F. Buckley Jr.
- Language: English
- Subject: Yale University
- Publisher: Regnery Publishing
- Publication date: 1951
- Publication place: United States
- Media type: Print

God and Man at Yale: The Superstitions of "Academic Freedom" is a 1951 book by William F. Buckley Jr., based on his undergraduate experiences at Yale University. Buckley, then aged 25, criticized Yale for forcing collectivist, Keynesian, and secularist ideology on students, criticizing several professors by name, arguing that they tried to break down students' religious beliefs through their hostility to religion and that Yale was denying its students any sense of individualism by forcing them to embrace the ideas of liberalism. Buckley argued that the Yale charter assigns the authority for oversight of the university to the alumni, and that because most alumni of Yale believed in God, Yale was failing to serve its "masters" by teaching course content in a manner inconsistent with the beliefs of the alumni. Buckley eventually became a leading voice in the American conservative movement in the latter half of the twentieth century.

== Reviews and legacy ==
God and Man at Yale received some mixed or harsh reviews when it was first published, including those of Peter Viereck and McGeorge Bundy.

Many American academics and pundits underestimated the ultimate impact that the book and its author would have on American society, thinking that it would quickly fade into the background. Quite the opposite happened, as Buckley used it as a launching pad into the public eye. Buckley himself credited the attention his book received to its introduction, written by John Chamberlain, saying that it "chang[ed] the course of his life" and that the famous Life editorial writer had acted out of "reckless generosity". Buckley went on to be an active force in the conservative movement through the political magazine he started, National Review, and his television show Firing Line. The magazine and its creator played a crucial role in tying together the different factions of the arising conservative movement to form a potent political force.

George Will called the book "a lovers' quarrel with his alma mater". In 2002, the work was featured in the C-SPAN original series American Writers: A Journey Through History, which focused on American writers of significance over the society's first 400 years, in an episode entitled "Writings of Kirk and Buckley".

Assessments in 2011, sixty years after publication of the book include:

- "All-Time 100 Nonfiction Books" of Time magazine on "the 100 best and most influential [books] written in English since 1923" (the first publication year of Time)
- a National Review symposium on the book.
