= Vern Smith (journalist) =

Vern R. Smith when posted to Moscow for The Daily Worker (6 August 1933).

Vern Ralph Smith (May 8, 1891 – October 27, 1978) was an American left-wing journalist who held editorial positions at several publications affiliated with the Industrial Workers of the World and the Communist Party USA (CPUSA). He is best known for his work as the Moscow correspondent for the CPUSA's newspaper, The Daily Worker, during the mid-1930s.

== Background ==
Smith was born on May 8, 1892, in Alila, California, the son of a dairy farmer. He attended public school in Tulare County, California, where he graduated as the valedictorian of his class. During high school, Smith served as editor of the student newspaper, an early indication of his future career in journalism. One of four children, he spent his youth working on the family farm in the San Joaquin Valley before leaving for university at the age of 20.

Smith attended the University of California, Berkeley, where he earned a bachelor's degree in economics in 1916. While at Berkeley, he was active in student politics, serving as secretary of the university’s chapter of the Intercollegiate Socialist Society and as president of the California International Cosmopolitan Club.

== Career ==
During World War I, Smith served as a Second Lieutenant in the infantry in the Officers' Reserve, although he was never called to active duty.

Smith worked in a variety of roles, including as a farmhand, construction worker, and storekeeper.

=== Wobbly ===
Smith traveled east and worked in the Kansas wheat fields. In 1921, he joined the Industrial Workers of the World (IWW) as a member of the Agricultural Workers' Industrial Union, No. 110. He later followed the harvest to Canada, before heading to Seattle, Washington, where he became editor of the IWW's West Coast newspaper, The Industrial Worker.

In 1922, Smith joined the local "Marxian Club" in Seattle. He later recalled:

"I read Marx's Capital and decided that the Communists probably had the right idea and joined the Marxian Club. This club was a legal group in Seattle under the influence of the underground Communist Parties. I never got into the underground movement, but went with the club into the Workers Party when the club joined the Party in a body immediately after the organization of the Workers Party [in December 1921]."

Smith was one of three key members of the IWW to join the Communist movement, the others being Elizabeth Gurley Flynn and Harrison George.

=== Communist ===
When the IWW turned against the Communists in 1922, Smith remained in the union under the direction of the Workers Party in Seattle. Smith continued as editor of the paper until June 1923, at which point the IWW sent him to Chicago to edit the organization's primary English-language newspaper, Industrial Solidarity. He also served as assistant manager of the IWW's Educational Bureau in 1924.

In 1926, Smith was exposed as a secret member of the Workers (Communist) Party and was fired from his position as editor of Industrial Solidarity. He was immediately hired by the Communist Party's daily newspaper, The Daily Worker, which was also published in Chicago at the time.

When the paper moved to New York City in 1927, Smith relocated with it and remained on the staff for the rest of the 1920s and most of the 1930s, except for a seven-month period when he served as editor of Labor Unity, the monthly magazine of the Trade Union Unity League, an affiliate of the Communist Party. In 1927, Smith drafted a petition to remove the paper's editor J. Louis Engdahl, which was signed by most of the staff, including Harry Freeman, Sender Garlin, and Whittaker Chambers.

From 1931 to 1932, Smith was dispatched by The Daily Worker to cover the Harlan County War and coal mine strikes in Harlan County, Kentucky. Smith was arrested along with several strike organizers and relief workers and spent four months in the Harlan County jail, including 31 days in solitary confinement.

In August 1933, Smith replaced Nathaniel Buchwald as Moscow correspondent for The Daily Worker. During his time in Moscow, Smith wrote two books favorable to the Soviet system, one about coal miners in the Donets Basin and another about workers in the Ukrainian collective farm village of Starosellye, Ukraine.

After his time in Moscow, Smith returned to California, where he became labor editor and foreign editor for the CP's California newspaper, the Daily People's World. He also taught at the Tom Mooney Labor School, a Communist Party educational project in San Francisco.

In 1946, Smith was expelled from the Communist Party during its crackdown on so-called anti-revisionist left-wing factional dissidents. Other members of this factional expulsion included Sam Darcy, William F. Dunne, and Smith's fellow editor at the Daily People's World, Harrison George. Some contemporary memoirs suggest that the purge stemmed from an internal Party struggle among left-wing members of the Machinists' Union, which was involved in a bitter strike in San Francisco.

== Personal life and death ==
Whittaker Chambers described Smith as a Stalinist and a Fosterite in the late 1920s.

Vern Smith died at the age of 87 on October 27, 1978, in Alameda, California.

=== Legacy ===
Vern Smith's papers, primarily relating to his time as a member of the IWW, are held at the Kheel Center for Labor-Management Documentation and Archives in the Martin P. Catherwood Library at Cornell University in Ithaca, New York.

== Works ==
Books, Pamphlets

- The Frame-up System. New York: International Publishers, 1930.
- Miners in the Donbas. Moscow: Co-operative Publishing Society of Foreign Workers in the USSR, 1935.
- In a Collective Farm Village. Moscow: Co-operative Publishing Society of Foreign Workers in the USSR, 1936.
- History of the American Labor Movement, 1700-1943. San Francisco: Tom Mooney Labor School, n.d. [c. 1943].

Articles

- "The Roosevelt Program of Attack upon the Working Class," The Communist International, vol. 10 (September 15, 1933), pp. 596–603.
- "Beginnings of Revolutionary Political Action in the USA," The Communist, vol. 12, no. 10 (October 1933), pp. 1039–1054.
- "Farmer-Labour Party Developments," International Press Correspondence, vol. 16 (May 16, 1936), pp. 626–627.
- "Trotsky Will Not Win American Labour," International Press Correspondence, vol. 17 (February 27, 1937), pp. 250–251.
