= James Ronda =

American historian

James P. Ronda (born May 30, 1943) is a now retired Western American historian. He is also an emeritus professor of history at the University of Tulsa. During his career, which began at Youngstown State University and finished at the University of Tulsa, Ronda became known for his research on the Lewis and Clark Expeditions. He has written multiple works on the subject, as well as appearing on C-Span for a special presentation about the writings of Lewis and Clark, which aired in 2001. Ronda's 1984 book Lewis and Clark: Among the Indians has contributed the most to his reputation as an authority on the subject. Ronda's largest contribution to his field of study was his inclusion of the Native American perspective in the Lewis and Clark expeditions.

== Early life and academic career ==
James P. Ronda was born on May 30, 1943, in Chicago, Illinois. He is married to Jeanne (Jean) Ronda and from an early age set out to become a professor at the university level. In 1980, he said, "I think I knew from the time I was quite young that I wanted to teach history at the university level, and my parents gave me a great deal of support for that choice." Ronda received his bachelor's degree from Hope College in Michigan. Following his graduation, he enrolled at the University of Nebraska–Lincoln, where he would go on to earn his master's and doctoral degrees. Ronda was hired as a professor at Youngstown State University in 1968, where he would serve until 1990. While at Youngstown, he taught and researched topics related to American history. Following his time at Youngstown, Ronda took a position as professor of Western American history, eventually serving as the H. G. Barnard Chair, at the University of Tulsa. He would serve at this university until his retirement in 2008. During his career, Ronda would also serve as President of the Western History Association. He was also named to the Advisory Committee of the International Center for Jefferson Studies at Monticello. His successes as a professor and an author has led him to various on screen opportunities with C-SPAN, BBC, and PBS.

== Writings ==
Between 1968 and 1981, Ronda had written three books, but it wasn't until 1984 that his breakthrough work was published. Lewis and Clark: Among the Indians, published by the University of Nebraska, provided a unique perspective on the already well-known adventures of Lewis and Clark. In the introduction to the bicentennial edition of his book, Ronda cites John Logan Allen's Passage Through the Garden: Lewis and Clark and the Image of the American Northwest as his early inspiration for this book. While reading Allen's book, he committed himself to engaging in a study on Lewis and Clark's interactions and relations with the Native American populations they encountered. His book would provide a new way to study the events of the Lewis and Clark expedition through the eyes of the Native Americans they encountered. This would prove to be a challenging task, but Ronda was able to put the narrative together after studying various expedition journals, notes, and other materials available. Since the publishing of this 1984 book, Ronda has produced multiple titles related to the West, and Lewis and Clark. In one of his latest works to date, Beyond Lewis and Clark: The Army Explores the West, Ronda approached the story of Lewis and Clark once again, but focused instead on the overall expeditions by the Army. Stories of Lewis and Clark have dominated the topic of western discovery, however Ronda sets out to tell further stories of the army's role in western exploration. Beyond these two books, Ronda has many other books that have given him recognition. A list of some of his major books are listed in chronological order below.

== List of books ==
- Lewis and Clark Among the Indians (1984)
- Astoria and Empire (1990)
- Revealing America: Image and Imagination in the Exploration of North America (1996)
- From Conquest to Conservation: Thomas Jefferson and the Changing West (1997)
- Voyages of Discovery: Essays on the Lewis and Clark Expedition (1998)
- Jefferson’s West: A Journey with Lewis and Clark (2000)
- Finding the West: Explorations with Lewis and Clark (2001)
- Beyond Lewis and Clark: The Army Explores the West (2003)
- The West the Railroads Made (2008)

== Legacy ==
James Ronda's legacy will be tied to the attention he brought to the Native American perspective on the Lewis and Clark Expedition, along with the expanded information his multiple books have added to the subject. Beyond his direct contribution through his writing, his contribution in the classroom have impacted many future historians, providing them with knowledge of the topic and the techniques necessary for those who hope to practice in the field of history.
