= Geoffrey Perret =

American historian

- Born: [Kingston upon Hull, United Kingdom]

Academic work
- Main interests: U.S. history
- Influenced: Kingston upon

Geoffrey Perret is an English author who writes about American history. His work focuses primarily upon the political dynamics that influence strategic and tactical military decisions, as well as broader political themes. He has published over thirteen books dealing with a variety of topics such as the US Presidency, including several biographies of iconic Presidents such as John F. Kennedy and Ulysses S. Grant; leading American military commanders such as Douglas MacArthur; and pivotal American military engagements. He also has had one novel, "Executive Privilege" published.

His earlier works use the spelling "Perrett" for his last name.

== Education ==
After serving in the US Army for three years, Perret studied at Long Beach City College and then obtained his undergraduate degree summa cum laude from the University of Southern California in 1967. He was also elected to Phi Beta Kappa. He obtained his postgraduate degree from Harvard University in 1969 and then studied law at the University of California at Berkeley.

== Selected publications ==
Title	Year	ISBN	Publisher	Subject matter	Interviews, presentations, and reviews	Comments
America in the Twenties: A History	1982	ISBN 9780671251079	Simon and Schuster		New York Times review by Michiko Kakutani, August 12, 1982	
Days of Sadness, Years of Triumph: The American People, 1939-1945	1985	ISBN 9780299103941	University of Wisconsin Press			
A Country Made by War: From the Revolution to Vietnam: the Story of America's Rise to Power	1989	ISBN 9780394553986	Random House			
There's a War to Be Won: The United States Army in World War II	1991	ISBN 9780394578316	Random House	Military history of the United States during World War II		
Winged Victory: The Army Air Forces in World War II	1993	ISBN 9780679404644	Random House	Military history of the United States during World War II		
Old Soldiers Never Die: The Life of Douglas MacArthur	1996	ISBN 9780679428824	Random House	Douglas MacArthur		
Ulysses S. Grant: Soldier & President	1997	ISBN 9780679447665	Random House	Ulysses S. Grant	Booknotes interview with Perret on Ulysses S. Grant, October 12, 1997, C-SPAN	
Eisenhower	1999	ISBN 9780375500466	Random House	Dwight Eisenhower	Presentation by Perret on Eisenhower, November 1, 1999, C-SPAN; Webcast Panel on U.S. General Dwight D. Eisenhower with Carlo D'Este at the Pritzker Military Museum & Library on October 23, 2003	
Jack: A Life Like No Other	2001	ISBN 9780375503634	Random House	John F. Kennedy	Presentation by Perret on Jack: A Life Like No Other, December 7, 2001, C-SPAN	
Lincoln's War: The Untold Story of America's Greatest President As Commander in Chief	2004	ISBN 9780375507380	Random House	Presidency of Abraham Lincoln	Presentation by Perret on Lincoln's War, June 2, 2004, C-SPAN; Webcast Interview on Lincoln's War: The Untold Story of America's Greatest President as Commander in Chief at the Pritzker Military Museum & Library on June 2, 2004	
Commander in Chief: How Truman, Johnson, and Bush Turned a Presidential Power into a Threat to America's Future	2007	ISBN 9780374102173	Farrar, Straus and Giroux		Presentation by Perret on Commander in Chief, April 16, 2007, C-SPAN	
