= Hallie Flanagan =

American theatrical producer (1890–1969)

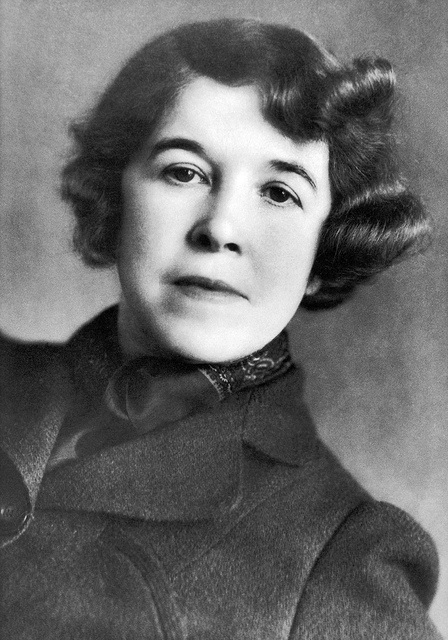
- Flanagan in 1940

Director of the Federal Theatre Project
- In office August 29, 1935 – June 30, 1939
- Appointed by: Franklin D. Roosevelt; Harry Hopkins
- Preceded by: Position established
- Succeeded by: Position abolished

Personal details
- Born: Hallie Ferguson; August 27, 1890 Redfield, South Dakota
- Died: July 23, 1969 (aged 78) Old Tappan, New Jersey
- Spouse(s): John Murray Flanagan (m. 1912; died 1919) Philip Haldane Davis (m. 1934; died 1940)
- Children: 2
- Parent(s): Frederic Miller Ferguson; Louise (Fisher) Ferguson
- Education: Grinnell College; Radcliffe College
- Occupation: Theatrical producer, director, playwright, author, professor

Hallie Flanagan Davis (August 27, 1890 – July 23, 1969) was an American theatrical producer and director, playwright and author, best known for running the Federal Theatre Project, a part of the Works Progress Administration (WPA) during the New Deal.

== Early life ==
Hallie Ferguson was born in Redfield, South Dakota in 1890. When she was ten years old, her family moved to Grinnell, Iowa. She attended Grinnell College where she majored in philosophy and German, and was an active member in the literary and dramatic clubs. During her time there, she became friends with Harry Hopkins, who also grew up in Grinnell and was a year behind her at the college. Her friendship with Hopkins would later be instrumental in her obtaining a leadership position in the WPA Federal Theatre Project.

She met her future husband, Murray Flanagan, at Grinnell. He was also a member of the dramatic club. She graduated with a BA in 1911. Soon afterwards, she and Murray got married; they relocated to St. Louis, Missouri and then to Omaha, Nebraska. They had two sons, Jack and Frederick. While in Omaha, Murray was diagnosed with tuberculosis and died in 1919. Three years later, Hallie's elder son Jack succumbed to spinal meningitis. She and Frederick moved to Cambridge, Massachusetts where she enrolled in George Pierce Baker's "47 Workshop" dramatic production studio at Radcliffe College/Harvard University. This class, one of the first of its kind at an American university, taught playwriting. Baker was so impressed with Flanagan, he appointed her director of the workshop's actors' group in 1923. She received an MA from Radcliffe in 1924. During this time, Flanagan began developing her own ideas for experimental theatre.

== Career ==
=== Vassar College ===
In 1925, Flanagan was hired as professor at Vassar College. When she arrived, there was no theater on campus, and all drama courses were taught in the English department. Her official title at the school was "Director of English Speech". In 1926, she became the first woman awarded a Guggenheim Fellowship to study theatre. She traveled around Europe for 14 months, and met some of the leading figures in theatre including John Galsworthy, Konstantin Stanislavsky, Edward Gordon Craig, Lady Gregory, and Luigi Pirandello. Flanagan especially shared a connection with the Russian theater. She later wrote a book, Shifting Scenes of the Modern European Theater (1928), based on her travels.

After returning to Vassar, she began to institute many of her newly developed ideas with the Vassar Experimental Theatre, which she created. The first play she produced was Anton Chekhov's Marriage Proposal, using the original Chekhov style for Act I, an expressionistic style for Act II, and Meyerhold's constructivist techniques for Act III.

She remarried in 1934, to Philip Davis, a professor of Greek at Vassar. Like her first marriage, it was cut short by illness. Her husband died suddenly of a cerebral hemorrhage in 1940.

While at Vassar, she received national publicity for producing and co-writing the theatrical adaptation, Can You Hear Their Voices?, based on a short story that Whittaker Chambers had written for New Masses magazine in 1931. Over the years, Flanagan pushed the Vassar administration to start an independent major in drama, but it was not approved until after she left the college.

=== Federal Theatre Project ===
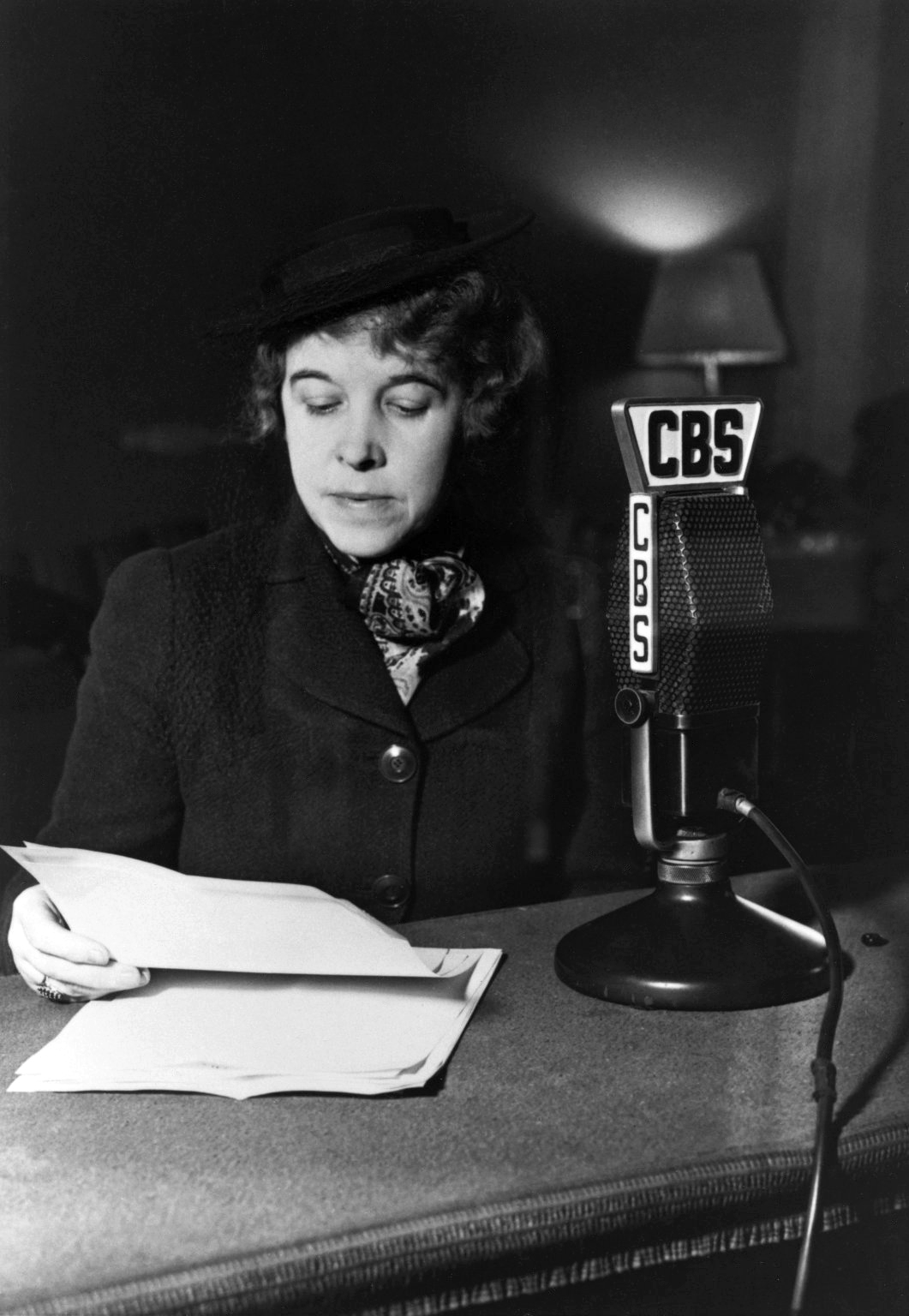
Flanagan on CBS Radio for the Federal Theatre of the Air (1936)

With the onset of the Great Depression, and masses of people (including the theatrically inclined) out of work, Franklin D. Roosevelt established the Works Progress Administration (WPA) as a jobs program. Among the WPA's branches was the Federal Theatre Project (FTP), which aimed to employ theatrical workers across America. In 1934, WPA head Harry Hopkins, who knew Flanagan from Grinnell College and had read her book Shifting Scenes of the Modern European Theatre, asked her to lead the FTP. She would later write:

My first initimation that the problem of unemployed theater workers was of any concern to the Government of the United States came in February of 1934 when Mr. Harry Hopkins telephoned me from New York: "We've got a lot of actors on our hands. Suppose you come in to New York and talk it over."

The FTP was funded and operational by August 1935. Flanagan's vision was to bring high-quality, cutting-edge theatre to the masses of American people, many of whom had never witnessed live theater. The Project paid salaries to struggling artists and crafts workers, and staged affordable productions across the nation. The FTP created children's theatre as well as Living Newspaper plays, based on German director Erwin Piscator's concepts, that would reach out to the culturally unaware.

Though the Project staged a wide variety of works, conservatives took issue with the apparent political agendas being delivered by some of the plays. Concerns over works with messages deemed to be communistic plagued Flanagan and jeopardized the continued existence of the FTP. She would later say in her Congressional testimony, "The basis of the choice of plays is that we have always believed in the Federal Theatre Project that any theater supported by the Federal funds should do no plays of a subversive, or cheap, or shoddy, or vulgar, or outworn, or imitative nature, but only such plays as the Government could stand behind in a program which is national in scope and regional in emphasis and democratic in American attitude."

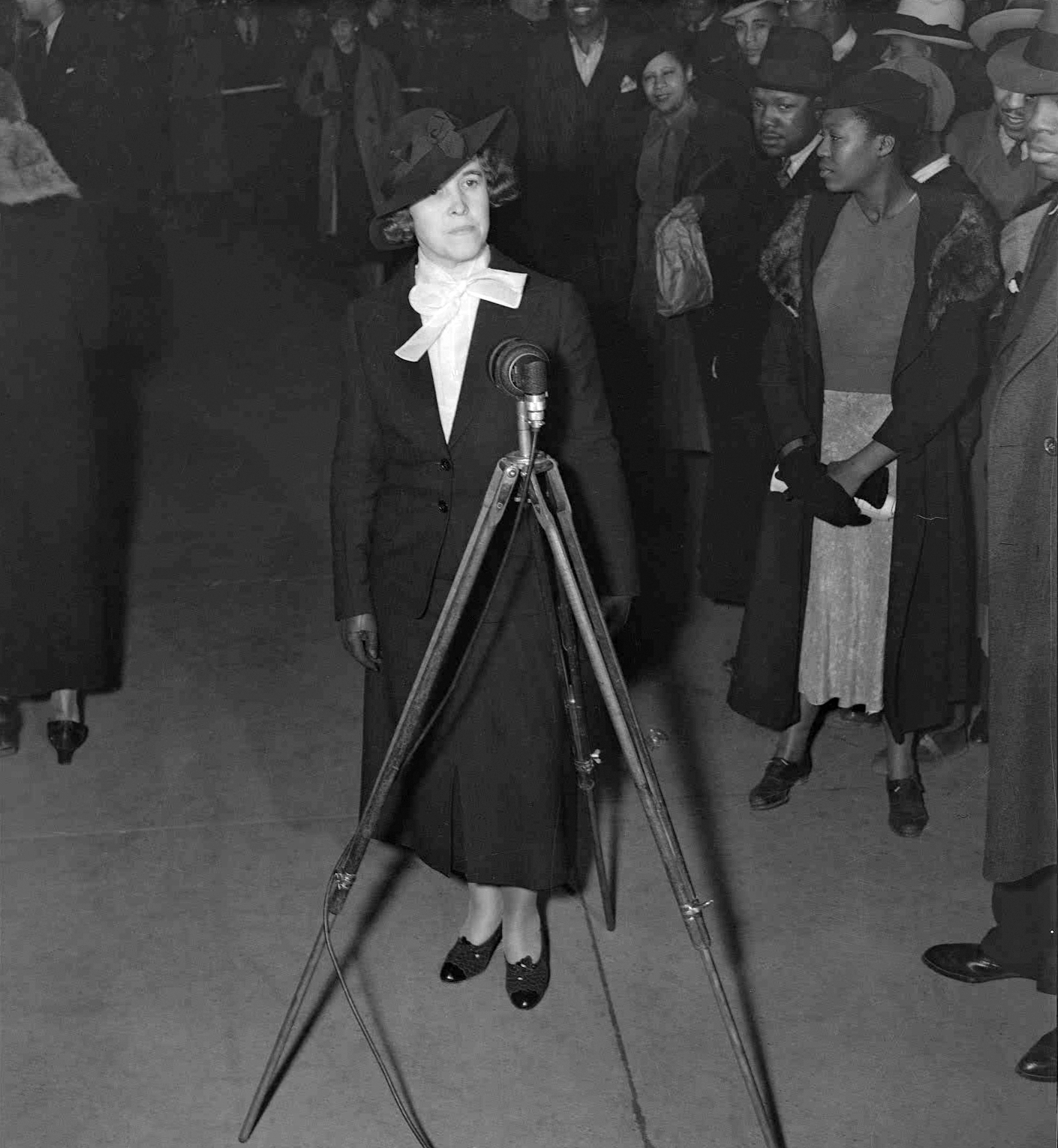
Flanagan at the opening of Macbeth (April 14, 1936)

By 1936, Flanagan had hired 12,500 people across 28 states. In New York City alone, the FTP's productions played to weekly audiences of 350,000. Since the plays were federally funded, the Project could afford to sell tickets at drastically reduced prices, making the productions accessible and inclusive to a wider audience.

In 1938, Flanagan was called to testify before the House Un-American Activities Committee, chaired by Texas Congressman Martin Dies, Jr. She was accused of supporting a communist agenda and subverting American values. The FTP was also attacked for its focus on racial injustice. Flanagan had called for a theatre free of racial prejudice. She "directed her subordinates to enforce strictly the WPA prohibitions against prejudicial actions." The accusations of communist infiltration, combined with the Project's efforts at racial integration, resulted in Congress cancelling the FTP's funding, effective June 30, 1939.

After operating for less than four years, the Federal Theatre Project was shut down, and Flanagan returned to Vassar. She soon published a history, Arena: The Story of the Federal Theatre (1940), which chronicled her experiences with the Project, her theories on the social and political possibilities of federally funded theater, and some of the successes the Project was able to achieve. In a tribute published shortly after her death, former FTP participant John Houseman wrote:

[I]f the Federal Theatre in its brief existence showed the energy and the quality that caused a leading New York critic to describe it as "the chief producer of works of art in the American theatre," the credit is mostly Hallie Flanagan's. The choice of personnel was hers; so was the imagination and the nerve.... It is for those three frantic and fantastic years that she will be remembered—the years in which she and her collaborators turned a dubious and pathetic relief project into what remains, after forty years, the most creative and dynamic approach that has yet been made to an American national theatre.

=== Smith College ===
Despite the political controversy surrounding the demise of the Federal Theatre Project, Flanagan was recognized for her contributions to modern theater. In 1941, she received an honorary degree from Williams College. The following year, she accepted a job offer from Smith College to work as a drama professor and also serve as Dean of the college. In 1946 she resigned the position of Dean in order to concentrate on the Theater Department, of which she was the chair. She wrote and directed multiple college productions. In 1953, she took a leave of absence from Smith, and in 1955 she officially retired and went to live in Poughkeepsie.

== Later years ==
Numerous honors were bestowed on Flanagan in her later years. In 1957 she received one of the first Brandeis University Creative Arts Awards. In 1962, the Studio Theater in Smith College's new Center for the Performing Arts was named in her honor. She was a recipient of the first National Theater Conference Citation award in 1968.

In the 1960s, Flanagan's health began to fail. Her Parkinson's disease, which she had been diagnosed with in 1945, worsened and she spent the last three years of her life in nursing homes. On July 23, 1969, she died in Old Tappan, N.J. She was 78.

== In popular culture ==
In Tim Robbins' Cradle Will Rock (1999), Cherry Jones played Hallie Flanagan.

Flanagan is a minor character in the novel The Group, written by Vassar grad Mary McCarthy. Flanagan is mentioned in the novel's first chapter and appears briefly again in the last chapter.

== Bibliography ==
- Flanagan, Hallie (1928). Shifting Scenes of the Modern European Theatre. New York: Coward-McCann. LCCN 28029742. OCLC 1841528.
- —— (1931). Can You Hear Their Voices? A Play of Our Time. Poughkeepsie: Experimental Theatre of Vassar College. LCCN 31016115. Co-written with Margaret Ellen Clifford, and adapted from a short story by Whittaker Chambers.
- —— (1932). The Curtain: A Play in One Act. New York: Samuel French. OCLC 4014669.
- —— (1933). The Sky Will Be Lit Up: A Play in Three Acts. Poughkeepsie: Experimental Theatre of Vassar College. LCCN 2021656364. Co-written with Janet Hartmann.
- —— (1934). American Plan: A Play of Our Time. Poughkeepsie: Experimental Theatre of Vassar College. LCCN 34000267. OCLC 20584016. Co-written with Mary C. St. John.
- —— (1939). What Was Federal Theatre?. Washington, D.C.: American Council on Public Affairs. LCCN 41006744. OCLC 8087211.
- —— (1940). Arena. New York: Duell, Sloan and Pearce. LCCN 41000231.
- —— (1943). Dynamo: The Story of the Vassar Theatre. New York: Duell, Sloan and Pearce. LCCN 43051199. OCLC 307624.
- —— (1948). E=mc²: A Living Newspaper about the Atomic Age. New York: Samuel French. LCCN 49020586. OCLC 336232. Co-written with Sylvia Gassel and Day Tuttle.

== See also ==
- Can You Hear Their Voices?
- Living Newspaper
- Vassar College
- Federal Theatre Project
- Works Progress Administration
