= Witness (memoir) =

American Pre-Cold War memoir about Espionage

- Cover of the first American edition
- Author: Whittaker Chambers
- Language: English
- Subject: Espionage, communism
- Genre: Memoir
- Publisher: Random House, Regnery Publishing
- Publication date: May 1952
- Publication place: United States of America
- Pages: 799 (body)
- Awards: 1953 National Book Award finalist for nonfiction
- Dewey Decimal: 324.273/75/092 B
- LC Class: E743.5 .C47
- Followed by: Cold Friday (1964)
- Website: https://whittakerchambers.org/

Witness, first published in May 1952, is a best-selling book of memoirs by American writer Whittaker Chambers (1901–1961), which recounts his life as a dedicated Marxist-communist ideologist in the 1920s, his work in the Soviet underground during the 1930s, and his 1948 testimony before the US Congress, which led to a criminal indictment against Alger Hiss and two trials in 1949.

== Background ==
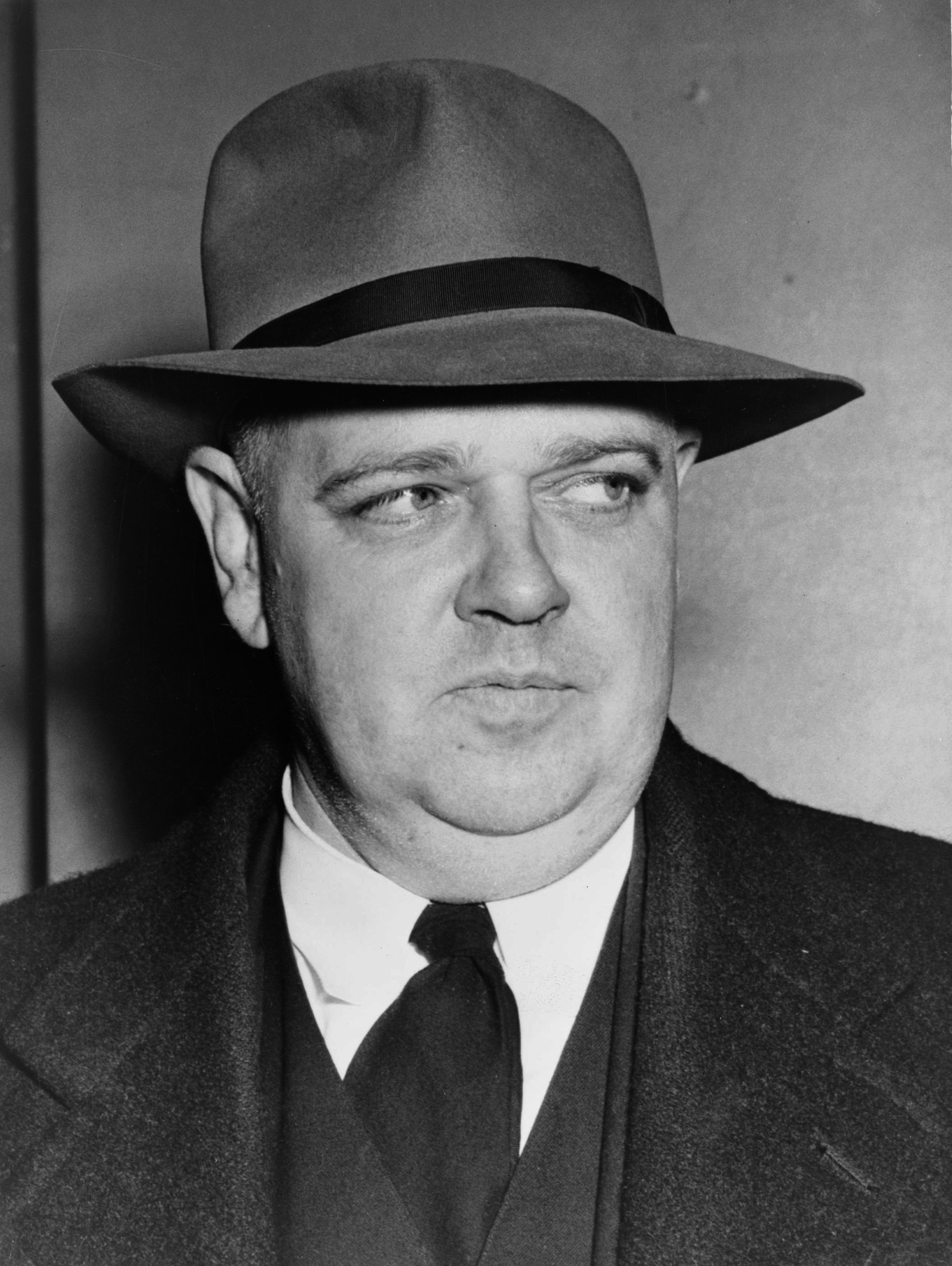
Whittaker Chambers, author of Witness (from 1948 photo in the Library of Congress)

What became the "Hiss Case" started on August 3, 1948, when Whittaker Chambers appeared under subpoena before the US House Un-American Activities Committee (HUAC) and testified about his work in the Soviet underground, including service in the mid-1930s as courier between Soviet handlers in New York and members of the Ware group, a network of US federal officials whose primary purpose was to infiltrate government but also to obtain intelligence. On December 15, 1948, US Department of Justice indicted Alger Hiss on two counts of perjury as part of a related grand jury investigation.

As early as December 16, 1948 (the day after the Hiss indictment), Chambers received the first offer for a memoir – from William Phillips, publisher of Partisan Review (a leftist, anti-Stalinist journal), followed by British MP Richard Crossman (for contribution to The God That Failed, published in 1949), and David McDowell of Random House (and friend of Chambers' friend and colleague, James Agee. Chambers chose Brandt & Brandt (now Brandt & Hochman) as his literary agents. Brandt sold the rights to Random House, after some concern from co-founder Bennett Cerf (a classmate of Chambers at Columbia University).

== Summary ==
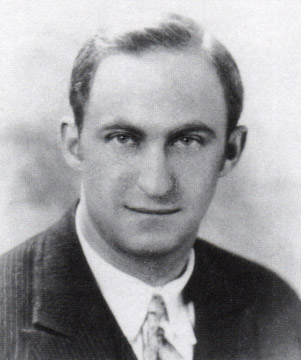
Factional infighting among CPUSA leaders including co-founder Jay Lovestone disgusted Chambers

Witness contains fifteen chapters. It leads with a 21-page "Foreword in the Form of a Letter to My Children."

The memoir then plunges readers in media res circa 1938 as Chambers is defecting from the Soviet underground and goes into hiding. Succeeding chapters return to chronological order about Chambers' childhood and how he became a Marxist and member of the Workers Party of America (the Communist Party USA by 1929). Disgusted by CPUSA factionalism between followers of Jay Lovestone, James P. Cannon, and William Z. Foster, Chambers accepted orders to go into what he believed was the Party's underground but turned out to be Soviet-controlled espionage that involved the Ware group, of which Alger Hiss was a member. After Chambers' defection, it chronicles "tranquil years" at Time magazine under managing editor T.S. Matthews, during which Chambers rose from writer to editor to senior editor. As acting Foreign Desk editor during World War II, Chambers added an anti-Stalinist slant that created enmity among the majority liberal- and left-wing Time writers, as well as support from Time co-founder Henry Luce.

Nearly half the remaining book recounts the first half-year of the Hiss Case (August 1948 – January 1950), from Chambers' initial testimony in Washington on August 3, 1948, Hiss' libel suit against Chambers in Baltimore, and a grand jury investigation in New York City that resulted in Hiss' indictment on December 15, 1948. The memoir spends less than ten pages on the two trials of Alger Hiss – which by that time had already received coverage in newspaper, magazines, and radio, as well as serving as the main subject of two books published in 1950: Seeds of Treason by conservative journalists Ralph de Toledano and Victor Lasky and A Generation on Trial by liberal journalist Alistair Cooke (later host of Masterpiece Theater).

While many events in the book predate the Cold War and McCarthyism, other events occur after the start date of the Cold War (March 12, 1947 – the Truman Doctrine), while US Senator Joseph McCarthy cited the Hiss Case in his famous first "Enemies Within" speech in Wheeling, WV, on February 9, 1950, which followed less than two weeks after the conviction of Alger Hiss.

== Publication ==
=== Book Serialization ===
In the Spring of 1952, the Saturday Evening Post, then still the most widely circulated weekly magazine in the US, ran a series of twelve (12) excerpts from Witness under the title "I Was the Witness" from February 5 to April 12, 1952.

=== Book Publication ===
Random House published Witness in May 1952. It was a bestseller for more than a year and helped to pay off Chambers's legal debts, but bills lingered ("as Odysseus was beset by a ghost").

=== Printings, translations, formats ===
In 1952, Random House published Witness in trade hardback format, with several editions. In 1953, Andre Deutsch published a slightly shorter version of Witness in London. In 1969, Regnery published its first edition, in paperback, through an arrangement with Random House. In 1984, Regnery published hardback and paperback editions of Witness. Regnery continued printing Witness including 1997 and 2003. The latest printing of Witness was in 2014 by Regnery, when an ebook version also became available.

In 1954, Witness appeared in Spanish as El Testigo: El Caso Hiss. In 2005, Witness appeared in Czech as Svēdek.

Blackstone Audio has held audiobook rights since 1988.

== Reception ==
Witness received widespread acclaim. Kirkus Review called the "long awaited" book "fully fascinating as an anatomy of personal as well as political direction and misdirection." Time magazine (Chambers' former employer) stated "Its depth and penetration make Witness the best book about Communism ever written on this continent. It ranks with the best books on the subject written anywhere." The New York Times ran a review by philosopher Sidney Hook, who deemed the book "one of the most significant autobiographies of the twentieth century."

== Awards ==
- 1953 – National Book Award finalist for nonfiction (Witness)

== Legacy ==
Chambers was under contract from Random House to write a further memoir but died (July 9, 1961) before he completed it. His wife Esther Shemitz and former colleague Duncan Norton-Taylor chose, edited, and assembled portions of the follow-on book plus diary entries, poetry, and other writings, published as Cold Friday in 1964.

Witness helps document the rise of freshman US Representative Richard M. Nixon, who became a US Senator in 1950, US vice president under Dwight D. Eisenhower (1952, 1956), and US President (1968, 1972).

William F. Buckley Jr. canonized the book for his conservative movement, convinced Chambers to join his nascent National Review magazine for a few months (1956–57), and cited the book or Chambers in well over half of both his non-fiction and fiction books.

Ronald Reagan credited the book as the inspiration behind his conversion from a New Deal Democrat to a conservative Republican.

Other authors, as scholar Alan M. Wald has noted, have imitated the book's "Foreword in the Form of a Letter to My Children," e.g., Norman Podhoretz's "A Letter to My Son," Breaking Ranks (1979).

== Copyright ==
The memoir's copyright (renewed in 1980) remains with the family of Whittaker Chambers through December 31, 2047, on file with the US Copyright Office of the US Library of Congress.

== Adaptations ==
Theater

- A Shadow of My Enemy (1957): Stein and Day's Sol Stein published a theatrical treatment of the Hiss Case, after Chambers denied him rights to adapt Witness

Television

- Concealed Enemies (1984): WGBH-TV produced this PBS docudrama, which aired on the PBS television network and was not adapted from Witness

Film

- The book's copyright holders have declined all offers to date for a feature movie adaptation of Witness, despite interest and offers from people including playwright David Mamet and actors Jon Voight and Nick Searcy

== See also ==
- Whittaker Chambers
- Bibliography of Whittaker Chambers
