= James Tobin (author) =

American author of books of popular history and biography

External videos
- Booknotes interview with James Tobin on Ernie Pyle's War, August 10, 1997, C-SPAN
- Lecture by Tobin, "Ernie Pyle and War Reporting", March 11, 2014, C-SPAN
- Presentation by Tobin on To Conquer the Air, April 25, 2003, C-SPAN
- Presentation by Tobin on The Man He Became, November 21, 2013, C-SPAN
- Presentation by Tobin on The Man He Became, June 21, 2014, C-SPAN

James E. Tobin (born 1956) is an American author of books of popular history and biography, including Ernie Pyle's War: America's Eyewitness to World War II (Free Press, 1997), which won the National Book Critics Circle Award in the biography/autobiography category. Since 2006 he has been a professor of journalism at Miami University in Oxford, Ohio.

His other books include To Conquer the Air: The Wright Brothers and the Great Race for Flight (Free Press 2003); Great Projects (Free Press 2001); and The Man He Became: How FDR Defied Polio to Win the Presidency (Simon & Schuster, 2013). In 2021, his retelling of the story of Roosevelt and polio for young-adult readers was published as Master of His Fate: Roosevelt's Rise from Polio to the Presidency (Henry Holt).

With the syndicated cartoonist Dave Coverly, Tobin has written two picture books for children, Sue MacDonald Had a Book (Henry Holt, 2009) and The Very Inappropriate Word (Henry Holt, 2013).

He has written often about the history of the University of Michigan, his alma mater. A collection of his articles, Sing to the Colors: A Writer Explores Two Centuries at the University of Michigan (2021), was published by the University of Michigan Press. He planned and edited an illustrated volume, "Our Michigan" (2024), also published by U-M Press.

Tobin earned a B.A. (1978) and a PhD (1986) in history at the University of Michigan. From 1986 to 1998 he was a reporter at the Detroit News.

== Awards and honors ==
- Ernie Pyle's War: National Book Critics Circle Award in biography/autobiography, 1997; New York Times Notable Book of 1997.
- To Conquer the Air: J. Anthony Lukas Work-in-Progress Award, 2000; Great Lakes Book Award. In the Wall Street Journal, the historian William Rosen listed To Conquer the Air as one of "Five Best" books about invention.
- The Man He Became: Fellowship, National Endowment for the Humanities (2008); runner-up, Chautauqua Book Prize (2014).
