= Charlotte Black Elk =

Native American lawyer and activist from South Dakota (born 2001)

- Born: 1951 or 1952 (age 73–74); Pine Ridge Indian Reservation Manderson, South Dakota, U.S.
- Citizenship: Oglala Sioux Tribe and American
- Relatives: Black Elk (great-grandfather)

Charlotte A. Black Elk (1951 or 1952) is a political and environmental Native American activist. She is of Oglala Lakota heritage, and is the great-granddaughter of the holy man Nicholas Black Elk. She has become well known in recent years for her role as a primary advocate for the Lakota peoples regarding the protection of the Black Hills Land Claim. She is also known for her participation in documentaries covering the history of the Lakota people, including The Way West (1995) and The West (1996).

== Early life ==
Charlotte Black Elk grew up on the Pine Ridge Reservation, in the village of Manderson, which is where the Crazy Horse faction of the Lakota settled in the late 19th century. As a girl, she heard the stories of the elders and grew up with the rituals of the Lakota oral tradition. Today she speaks both English and Lakota.

== Career ==
In 1983, Black Elk began her involvement with the Black Hills Land Claim as secretary for the Sioux Tribal Council. Today, she acts as their legal representative.

== See also ==
- Black Elk Speaks

== Sources ==
- On the Rez by Ian Frazier, page 117
- http://www.imdb.com/name/nm1200653/
- Time Present, Time Past by Bill Bradley
- http://www.c-span.org/video/?165105-1/black-elk "Black Elk"
