= Arbeter Teater Farband =

American Jewish theatre and actors' association

Arbeter Teater Farband (ARTEF) (Yiddish: אַרבעטער טעאַטער פֿאַרבאַנד;"Worker's Theater Union") was a left-wing association of Jewish actors and other theatre persons in the United States during 1927–1940, and the theater with the same name. Their first play was in 1928. Theater historian Edna Nahshon described it as "one of the most prominent organizations of the American Yiddish stage". Nachson writes that the theatre was shut down due to the difficulties associated with both the diminished interest in Yiddish theatre and the disillusionment in Communism, especially after the Nazi-Soviet Molotov–Ribbentrop Pact. It was organized by Jewish members of the Young Workers' League. For some time the theatre survived in mobile groups that staged their performances in workers' neighborhoods.

Members included: Nathaniel Buchwald, Moyshe Olgin, David Pinski, David Abrams, Melech Marmur, Kalman Marmur, Shakhne Epstein, Moyshe Nadir.
