= John Chabot Smith =

American journalist

- Born: September 1, 1915; Croydon, England, UK
- Died: May 16, 2002 (aged 86); New York City, U.S.
- Education: Loomis Chaffee School; Princeton University
- Spouse: Betty McCarthy (m. 1940)
- Children: 2

John Chabot Smith (September 1, 1915 – May 16, 2002) was an American journalist and author, best known for his book: Alger Hiss: The True Story.

== Personal life ==
Smith was born on September 1, 1915, in Croydon, UK. He attended the Loomis Institute. He majored in history at Princeton University. He did graduate studies at Cambridge University. In 1940, Smith married Elizabeth (Betty) McCarthy of Rochester New York. They had two children; Elizabeth (Betsy) Smith and Michael Chabot Smith. They lived all over the world while he pursued his journalistic career and authored books, including Washington DC, London, Tokyo, New York City, settling in Weston CT to raise their children, and finally in Florida for retirement. His wife died in 1990 in Winter Park, Florida. He subsequently moved to Washington DC, and then settled in Park Slope, Brooklyn to be closer to his son Michael and his family. Smith died age 86 on May 16, 2002, in Brooklyn, New York.

== Career ==
Smith began his career as a journalist with The Washington Post. He joined the New York Herald Tribune as White House correspondent. Smith covered World War II overseas for the Herald-Trib. He covered the Hiss Case for the Herald Trib and later wrote a book about it, and about Hiss’s life in general. Three other journalists who covered the case also published books about it: Bert Andrews of Hearst, Ralph de Toledano of Newsweek, and Alistair Cooke of the Manchester Guardian. Hiss appeared with Smith at a press conference to promote the book, held at the Overseas Press Club. Leon Dennen called him a "pro-Tito correspondent."

== Works ==
Of his book on Alger Hiss, Kirkus noted: "Don't expect bombshells. The hard evidence is slow in coming and can be bewilderingly technical when it come." According to Allen Weinstein (whose book Perjury: The Hiss–Chambers Case, published in 1978, had different findings), "Smith adopted elements from a least six previous theories." The Western Journal of Speech Communications assessed the book as "thoroughly sympathetic [to Hiss]."

=== Books ===
- Alger Hiss: The True Story (1976)
- The Children of Master O'Rourke: An Irish Family Sage (1977)

=== Articles ===
- ”Woman Informer Against Reds Is Called by Thomas Committee" New York Herald Tribune (29 July 1948)
- "On Alger Hiss" New York Review of Books (25 November 1976)
- "The Debate of the Century" Harper's Magazine (June 1978)

== See also ==
- Alger Hiss
