= Hamer (surname) =

- Pronunciation: English: /ˈheɪmər/
- Language: English

Origin
- Language: English
- Origin: metonymic occupational name toponymic locational name
- Meaning: "hammer" (smith)

Hamer (said Hay-mer) is an English and Dutch surname. Hamer is Dutch and Middle English for "hammer", and is often a metonymic occupational name, e.g. referring to a smith. In English the name could also be toponymic, suggesting an origin in Hamer, Lancashire.

People with this surname include:

- Alain Hamer (born 1965), Luxembourgish football referee
- Arnold Hamer (1916–1993), English cricketer
- Ben Hamer (born 1987), English footballer with Charlton Athletic
- Bent Hamer (born 1956), Norwegian film director
- Colin Hamer (born 1988), Sint Maarten cricketer
- Dale Hamer (1937–2024), American football official
- David Hamer (1923–2002), Australian politician and navy officer
- David Hamer (footballer) (1869–1948), Welsh footballer with Southampton F.C.
- Dean Hamer (born 1951), American geneticist, author, and filmmaker
- Elizabeth Hamer Kegan (1912–1979), American archivist and librarian
- Elsie Hamer Wilkie (1922–1995), New Zealand lawn bowls player
- Fannie Lou Hamer (1917–1977), American civil rights leader
- Ferdinand Hamer (1840–1900), Dutch Catholic missionary and bishop in China
- Forrest Hamer (born 1956), American poet, psychologist, and psychoanalyst
- Frances Mary Hamer (1894–1980), British chemist
- Frank Hamer (1884–1955), Texas Ranger
- Frank Hamer (British Army officer) (1919–2009), World War II officer
- Fritz Hamer (1912–2004), German botanist
- Gabriel Hamer-Webb (born 2000), English rugby union player
- Garry Hamer (born 1943), Australian rules footballer
- Gerald Hamer (1886–1972), British film actor
- Gladys Hamer (1884–1967), British stage and film actress
- Graham Hamer (born 1936), New Zealand rugby coach
- Gustavo Hamer (born 1996), Dutch Brazilian football midfielder
- Harry Spencer Hamer (1863–1913), English football manager
- Hubert Hamer (born c. 1959), American agricultural scientist and administrator
- Ian Hamer (musician) (1932–2006), British jazz trumpeter
- Ian Hamer (athlete) (born 1965), British long-distance runner
- Jean Jérôme Hamer (1916–1996), Belgian Cardinal
- John Hamer (footballer) (born 1944), English football midfielder
- John C. Hamer (born 1970), American-Canadian historian and mapmaker
- John Hamer (figure skater) (born 1984), English figure skater
- Judith Hamer (born 1990), British wheelchair basketball player
- Julia Hamer-Bevis (born 1971), English professional wrestler known as "Sweet Saraya"
- Marcelle Lively Hamer (1900–1974), American librarian and folklorist
- Mariëtte Hamer (born 1958), Dutch Labour Party politician
- Michelle Hamer (artist) (born 1975), Australian visual artist
- Michelle Hamer (author), Australian author and journalist
- Nigel Hamer (born 1949/50), Canadian anglophone Québécois liberation activist
- Paul Hamer, Australian politician
- Philip M. Hamer (1891–1971), American archivist and historian
- Reino Hamer (1916–1992), German Major in the Second World War
- Robert Hamer (1911–1963), British film director and screenwriter
- Ru den Hamer (1917–1988), Dutch water polo player
- Rupert Hamer (1916–2004), Australian Liberal Party politician, Premier of Victoria 1972–1981
- Rupert Hamer (journalist) (1970–2010), British war correspondent killed in Afghanistan
- Russell Hamer (born 1940s), Sri Lankan cricketer
- Rusty Hamer (1947–1990), American actor
- Ryke Geerd Hamer (1935–2017), German physician
- Sam Hield Hamer (1869–1941), English writer
- Steve Hamer (footballer) (born 1951), Welsh football defender and club chairman
- Stu Hamer (born 1934), British jazz trumpeter
- Thomas L. Hamer (1800–1846), United States congressman and soldier
- Thomas Ray Hamer (1864–1950), United States Representative from Idaho
- Thomas Hamer (swimmer) (born 1998), British parasport swimmer
- Tor Hamer (born 1983), American boxer

== See also ==
- Ralph Hamers (born 1966), Dutch banker, CEO of ING Group
- Ralph Hamor (died 1626), English Virginia colonist
- Raymond Hamers (born 1930s), Belgian immunologist and biotechnologist
- Sebastian Hämer (born 1979), German singer and songwriter
