= Alsberg (surname) =

Alsberg is a surname. Notable people with the surname include:

- Carl L. Alsberg (1877–1940), American chemist
- Henry Alsberg (1881–1970), American journalist and writer
- Max Alsberg (1877–1933), criminal lawyer of the Weimar Republic
