= Historical Records Survey =

American New Deal work-relief project (1935–1943)

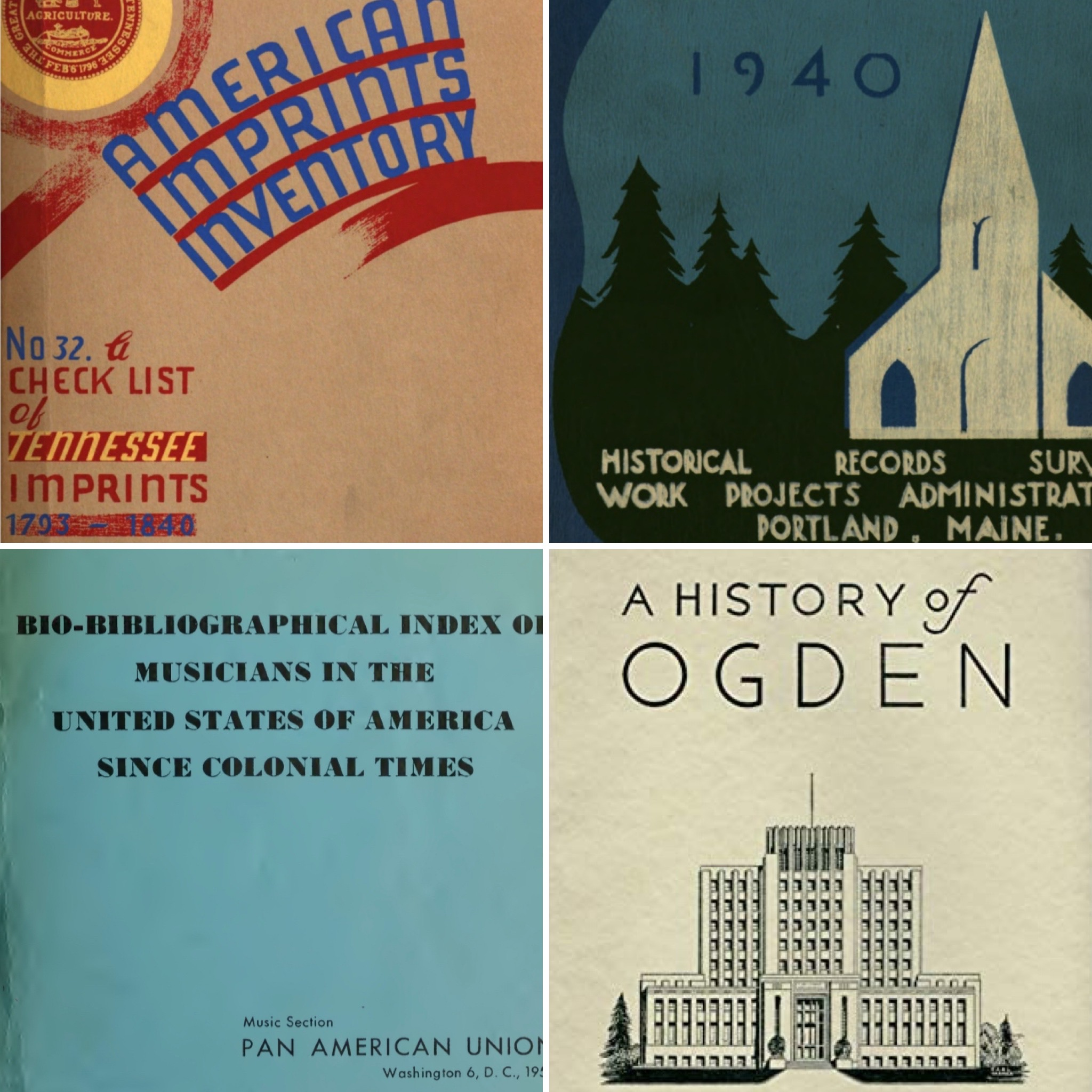
- HRS publications from Tennessee, Maine, Utah, and Washington, D.C.

New Deal cultural program overview
- Formed: 1935
- Preceding New Deal cultural program: Federal Writers' Project (initial branch)
- Dissolved: 1943
- Type: Historical documentation and archival indexing
- Jurisdiction: United States Federal
- Headquarters: Washington, D.C.
- Ministers responsible: Harry Hopkins, Administrator of the Works Progress Administration; Francis C. Harrington, Commissioner of the Work Projects Administration
- New Deal cultural program executives: Luther H. Evans, National Director (1935–1940); Sargent B. Child, National Director (1940–1942)
- Parent department: Federal Works Agency (1939–1943)
- Parent New Deal cultural program: Works Progress Administration

The Historical Records Survey (HRS) was a project of the Works Progress Administration New Deal program in the United States. Originally part of the Federal Writers' Project, it was devoted to surveying and indexing historically significant records in state, county and local archives. The official mission statement was the "discovery, preservation, and listing of basic materials for research in the history of the United States". The creation of the Historical Records Survey was one of the signal events "in what Solon Buck called the 'archival awakening' of the 1930s".

== Organization ==
Organized on November 15, 1935 under the direction of Luther H. Evans, the Survey began life under the Federal Writers' Project and in October 1936, became an independent section of Federal Project Number One and the Works Progress Administration's Women's and Professional Division. The project was granted a budget of $1,195,800 (equivalent to about $28,100,000 in 2025) twice over: one budget was for a survey of federal records located outside of Washington, D.C., and another budget in the same amount was for a survey of state and local historical records.

In 1939, with more artistic federal programs under attack from Congress, partly because they employed suspected Communists, the less controversial HRS was moved to the Work Projects Administration Research and Records Program, Professional and Service Division. Over the course of the program, HRS employed upwards of 10,000 American workers. Base pay for a month's work was between $50 and $60.

In 1939 the federal government handed off the program's activities to willing state governments; each state had its own supervisor co-ordinating the Survey's activities.

The HRS, headquartered in Washington, D.C., was organized into subdivisions (regional, state, district) and much of the work was done at the behest of the National Archives and Records Administration or state archive agencies. The HRS sometimes cooperated with the Daughters of the American Revolution and other volunteer groups with an interest in local history and genealogy. As noted in Evans' obituary in American Archivist, "Survey workers were active in every county of every state, in every state capitol, and in thousands of town halls."

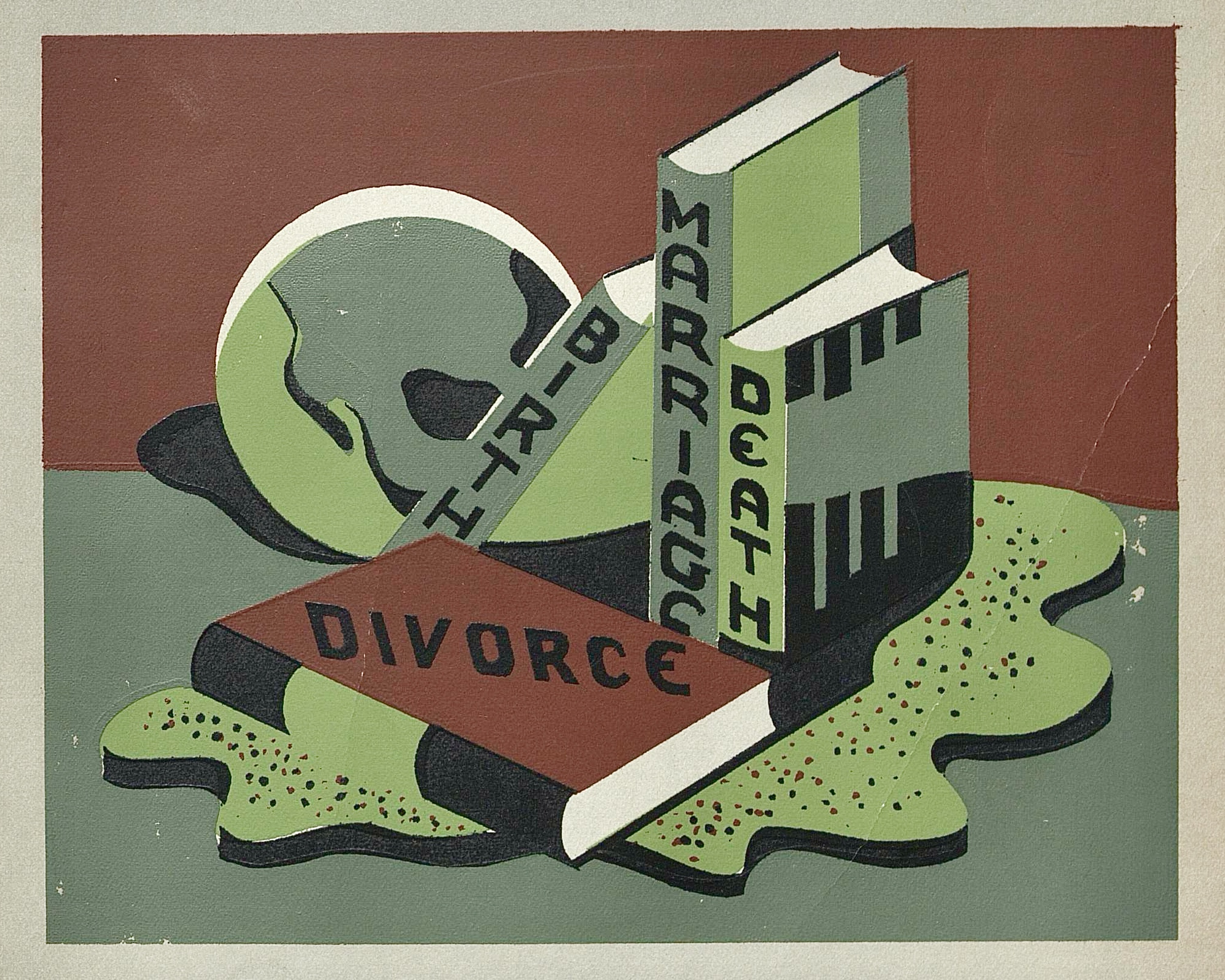
South Dakota Historical Records Survey publication (1942)

The HRS was generally considered the most efficient and inexpensive of the Federal One projects. However, because of the program's short lifespan, many of the indexes were not published and remain in only piecemeal form in local and state record repositories.

Evans' deputy Sargent B. Child became HRS director in March 1940 after Evans took a job with the Library of Congress' Legislative Services Division. Child served until 1942. In 1942, the HRS was reorganized under the Works Progress Administration Service Division War Service Section, which later discontinued "fact-finding, survey, records and clerical services" as superfluous to the war effort. Pursuant to a Presidential letter of December 4, 1942, the HRS program was shut down February 1, 1943.

To bring together the records of the past and to house them in buildings where they will be preserved for the use of men living in the future, a nation must believe in three things. It must believe in the past. It must believe in the future. It must, above all, believe in the capacity of its people so to learn from the past that they can gain in Judgment for the creation of the future.

— Franklin Delano Roosevelt, The Southern California historical records survey project, October 1941

== Achievements ==
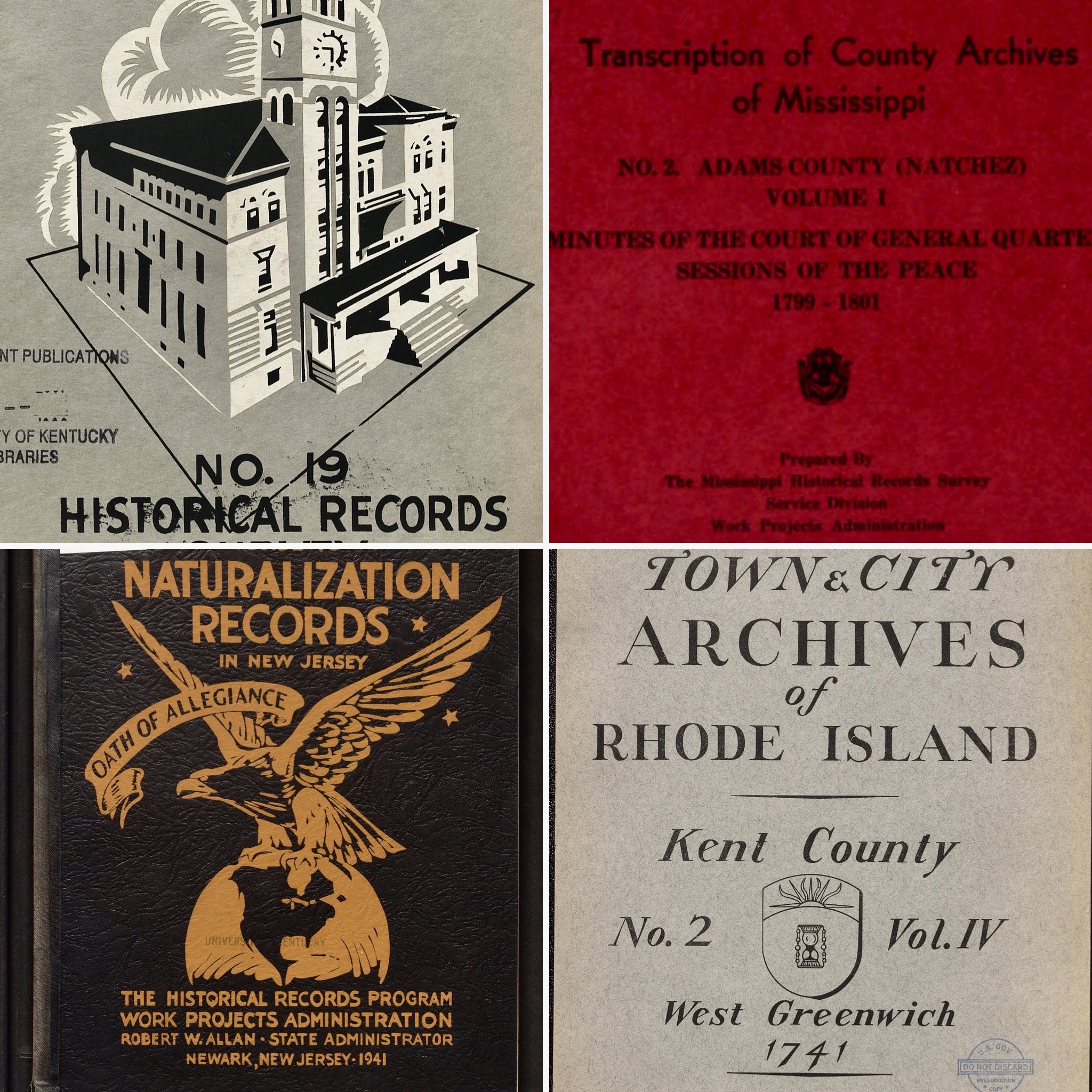
Publications from Missouri, Mississippi, Rhode Island, and New Jersey

According to regional historian Clifton Dale Foster, "In most states, several diverse projects were operating simultaneously. Its largest project was the Survey of County Records, which located, identified, arranged, and described massive amounts of public records found in county archives. The result was the publication of some 628 volumes of inventories. Other programs of major importance included the Survey of Federal Archives, directed by Philip M. Hamer; the Survey of Church Records; and the American Imprints Inventory."

Other accomplishments included the Soundex indexes for several of the states for several of the turn-of-the-century U.S. Censuses (1880, 1900, 1910, 1920), indexes of vital statistics, book indexes, bibliographies, lists of newspapers, cemetery indexes and newspaper indexes, the Atlas of Congressional Roll Calls Project, "a continuation of Richardson's Messages and Papers of the Presidents", a historical index of American musicians, surveys of portraits in public buildings, maritime records, and a necessary survey of the federal Archives—NARA itself had been established only in 1934.

As an example, the HRS documentation for Massachusetts included: "forty-five bundles of town inventories; ten bundles of county inventories; fourteen bundles relating to church records; four bundles of material gathered for a 'Guide to Manuscripts Relating to the Negro in Massachusetts'; ten bundles related to portraits, engravings, silhouettes; and more besides".

Each state operated independently and many produced interesting regional miscellany. The achievements of the extensive Wisconsin records survey, for one, included the usual indices as well as further: "a guide to the newspapers of one county, an index of governor's messages, a history of Galesville University, a style manual, a directory of U.S. government agencies in the state, and a checklist of statutory requirements for county records".

The Survey also innovated in archival practice. For example, it made use of new microfilm technology, experimented with its use in archiving, and advanced on previously existing practices.

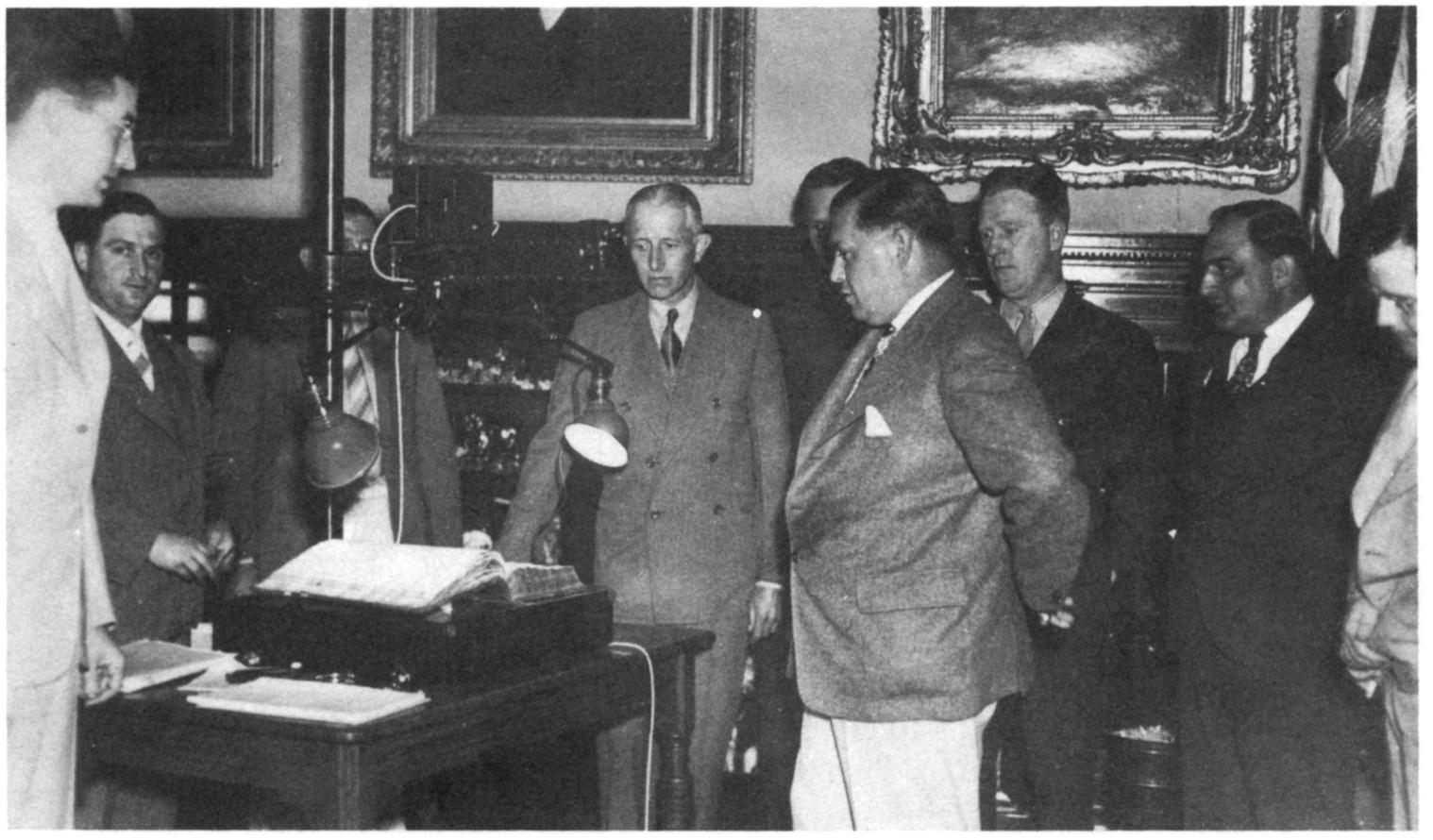
HRS microfilming New Jersey public records (1937)

A great deal of HRS work-product went unpublished; for example the HRS inventoried the historical records of more than 3,000 of the 3,143 U.S. counties but only published reports for 628 of them. A study of HRS usage found that HRS materials were often confused with FWP work product, and that genealogists and archivists were the most frequent users of HRS materials. Archivists sometimes use them as evidence that certain county or town-level materials were extant circa the 1930s, in hopes of urging local record keepers to release materials they hardly knew they had.

=== HRS directories ===
- Child, Sargent B. and Holmes, Dorothy P., WPA Technical Series, Research and Records Bibliography No. 7, "Bibliography of Research Projects Reports - Check List of Historical Records Survey Publications", Revised April, 1943, created by the Federal Works Agency, Work Projects Administration.
- Commercial reprint of above: Child, Sargent B. and Holmes, Dorothy P., Check List of Historical Records Survey Publications, Baltimore: Genealogical Publishing Co., 1969.
- Hefner, Loretta, The WPA Historical Records Survey: a guide to the unpublished inventories, indexes, and transcripts, Society of American Archivists. 1980 ISBN 0-931828-25-2

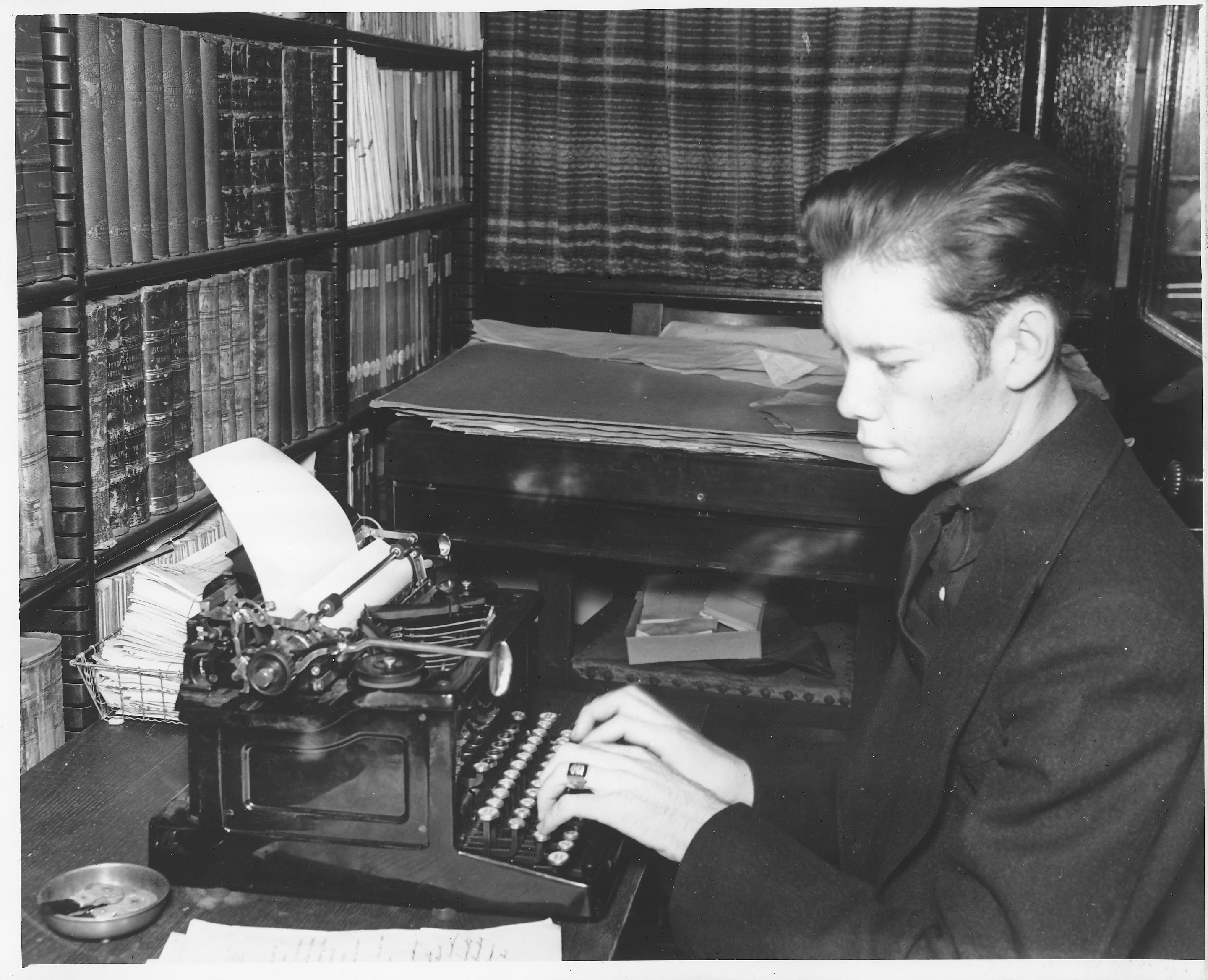
"WPA worker typing old historical records" in Kentucky

== See also ==
- American Guide Series
- Index of American Design
- Mathematical Tables Project
- Heritage Documentation Programs § Historic American Buildings Survey
