= Haymer =

Haymer is a surname. Notable people with the surname include:

- Herbie Haymer (1916–1949), American jazz saxophonist
- Johnny Haymer (1920–1989), American actor

== See also ==
- Hamer (surname)
- Hammer (surname)
