= John Hamer =

John Hamer is the name of:

- John Hamer (figure skater) (born 1982), English figure skater
- John Hamer (footballer) (born 1944), English footballer
- John C. Hamer (born 1970), American-Canadian historian and mapmaker
