= Ian Hamer =

Ian Hamer is the name of:

- Ian Hamer (musician) (1932–2006), British jazz trumpeter
- Ian Hamer (athlete) (born 1965), British long-distance runner

== See also ==
- Hamer (surname)
