= Henry Alsberg =

American journalist and writer

Henry G. Alsberg
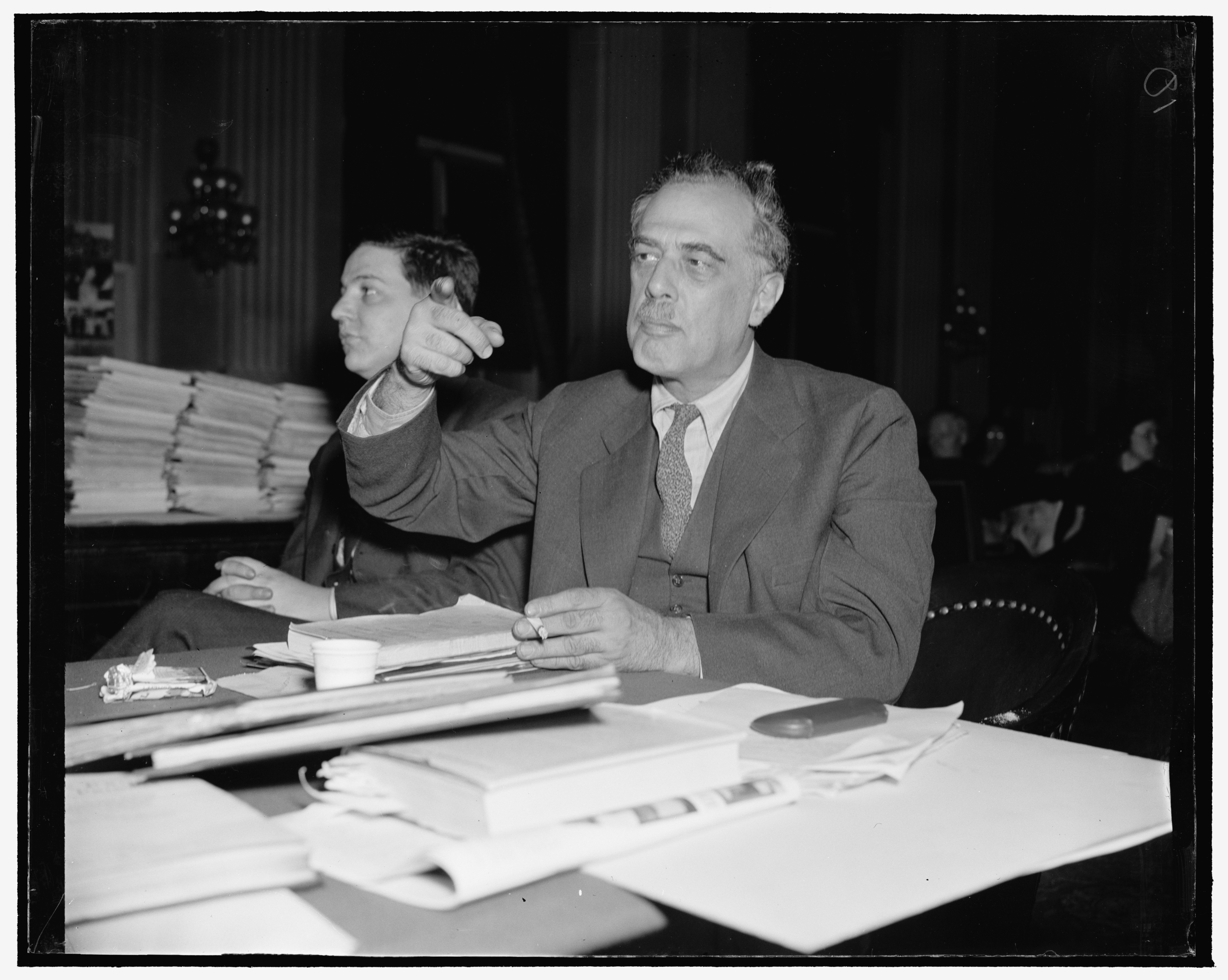
- Alsberg testifying before HUAC, December 1938
- Born: Henry Garfield Alsberg; September 21, 1881; New York City, New York, U.S.
- Died: November 1, 1970 (aged 89); Palo Alto, California, U.S.
- Education: Columbia University (AB, LLB); Harvard University
- Known for: Federal Writers' Project
- Relatives: Carl L. Alsberg (brother)

Henry Garfield Alsberg (September 21, 1881 – November 1, 1970) was an American journalist and writer who served as the founding director of the Federal Writers' Project.

A lawyer by training, he was a foreign correspondent during the Russian Revolution, secretary to the U.S. Ambassador to the Ottoman Empire, and an influential volunteer for refugee aid efforts. Alsberg was a producer at the Provincetown Playhouse. He spent years traveling through war-torn Europe on behalf of the American Jewish Joint Distribution Committee. After publishing several magazines for the Federal Emergency Relief Administration, he was appointed to head the Federal Writers' Project. Fired from the project in 1939 shortly after testifying before the House Un-American Activities Committee, he worked for a short time for the Office of War Information, before joining Hastings House Publishers as an editor.

== Early life and education ==
Alsberg was born September 21, 1881, in Manhattan to Meinhard and Bertha Alsberg. Meinhard was born in Arolsen, Germany and immigrated as a child with his family to the United States in 1865. He was naturalized in 1876. He married Bertha (born in New York City) and had four children with her, of whom Henry was the youngest.

Alsberg's parents were secular Jews, his mother being indifferent to religion and his father described as "aggressive in his agnosticism". Alsberg had neither a bris nor a Bar Mitzvah. He attended a shul only once as a child, when his grandmother took him to Temple Emanu-El, which infuriated his father.

Initially home-schooled, Alsberg was fluent in German and French, and spoke some Yiddish and Russian. For his secondary education, he attended Mount Morris Latin School. Alsberg suffered from lifelong digestive problems, possibly related to an incident in his teens when his appendix ruptured in the middle of the night. Alsberg waited till morning to tell his family rather than wake them up, and had emergency abdominal surgery.

Alsberg, called Hank by friends and family, entered Columbia University at age 15 in 1896, the youngest member of the class of 1900, who called themselves the "Naughty-Naughtians". Alsberg was an editor of the literary magazine The Morningside, and also contributed poems and short stories. He belonged to the Société Française and the Philharmonic Society (cellist), and participated in baseball, wrestling, and fencing. After graduation, Alsberg enrolled in Columbia Law School, graduating in 1903. Alsberg played two seasons on both the college and varsity football teams as guard and tackle.

After practicing law for three years, Alsberg entered Harvard's Graduate School of Arts and Science for a year to study comparative literature.

== Journalism, theater, and international activity ==
=== Early years in journalism ===
Uninterested in finishing his graduate studies at Harvard or practicing law, Alsberg moved back to New York City to write. He sent an early play to Paul Kester, who recommended it to Bertha Galland. He sold a short story, "Soirée Kokimono", to The Forum in 1912; the story was selected for the following year's Forum Stories compilation.

Abram Isaac Elkus, a friend of Alsberg's brother Carl and a strategist for Woodrow Wilson's presidential campaign, sent Alsberg to London to investigate claims that American-made goods were cheaper abroad than in the U.S. due to Republican-imposed tariffs. Alsberg wrote up the results of his investigation in an article published in the New York Sunday World. The Wilson campaign used it to buttress their platform's call to reduce tariffs.

Alsberg began writing for the New York Evening Post in 1913, as well as its sister publication The Nation. His 1914 article for The Masses criticized the churches that turned away homeless during the brutal blizzard that hit New York on March 1. Alsberg went to London where he began working as a roving foreign correspondent for The Nation, New York World, and London's Daily Herald.

In August 1916, Alsberg was appointed personal secretary and press attaché to Elkus, who had been appointed U.S. Ambassador to the Ottoman Empire; they traveled on the Oscar II to Constantinople via Copenhagen. Alsberg took charge of the embassy's efforts to aid Armenians and Jews, which put him in contact with the American Jewish Joint Distribution Committee (JDC). When the U.S. declared war on Germany in April 1917, Turkey broke off diplomatic relations and the American embassy officials left. On his return to the states, Alsberg met with Secretary of State Robert Lansing to brief him on conditions in Constantinople and offered a plan for separating the Ottoman Empire from the German Alliance, which Lansing passed on to Woodrow Wilson. The next day, former Ambassador Henry Morgenthau suggested a similar plan to Lansing. A mission to Turkey consisted of Morgenthau and Felix Frankfurter (then an assistant to the Secretary of War), with Alsberg advising them on conditions and issues.

In 1917, Alsberg taught a course on the socialist-inspired cooperative movement at the Rand School of Social Science, while again writing for Evening Post and The Nation. In the Evening Post, Alsberg disputed the authenticity of the Sisson Documents, claiming that they were forgeries, which was later confirmed by historians. In Jan 1919, Alsberg was secretary of the Palestine Restoration Fund Campaign's National Finance Commission, and wrote for The Maccabaean, the official organ of the Zionist Organization of America. Later in 1919, Alsberg returned to Europe as a foreign correspondent for The Nation. He attended the Peace Conference in Paris as attaché to the Zionist delegation. While there, Alsberg reconnected with the JDC which needed volunteers to assess and provide relief to destitute Jews in Central and Eastern Europe.

=== Work with the American Jewish Joint Distribution Committee ===
While volunteering with the JDC, Alsberg's passport listed his occupation as "food relief" for the American Relief Administration. Alsberg described the period after the Russian Revolution and World War I as "the emergence of many minor nationalities, all imbued with grand imperialistic passions, fighting for their independence in a condition of economic wretchedness and moral degradation". New nations were formed after the break-up of the Austro-Hungarian and Ottoman empires.

He spent four years in various countries, including the "bandit-ridden Ukraine". His first stop was the new country of Czechoslovakia, where he set up programs in Prague to help refugees. Alsberg also continued his reporting for The Nation, the London Herald, and the New York World, bringing the anti-Semitism he was observing to international attention. Some of his articles were noticed by American authorities for their sympathy to Bolshevik, anarchist, and radical ideas, and he was observed for some time by Allied military intelligence.

In April 1919, the JDC transferred him to Poland, though he went reluctantly, concerned about abandoning his work in Prague. In June, he returned briefly to Prague, then went to Paris where he witnessed the signing of the Treaty of Versailles. For the rest of the year, Alsberg traveled throughout eastern Europe, reporting on Hungary, Yugoslavia, Bulgaria, Romania, and the Balkans. His experiences and observations made him abhor violence.

=== Travels in Russia ===
In September 1919, Alsberg arrived at Kamianets-Podilskyi, which was being fought over by the Bolsheviks, the White Army, and the Ukrainian Independence Movement. He went to Odessa and on to Kiev with Allied military officers, where he reported on the pogroms, the terrorism by the Cossacks, and the atrocities of the Bolsheviks.

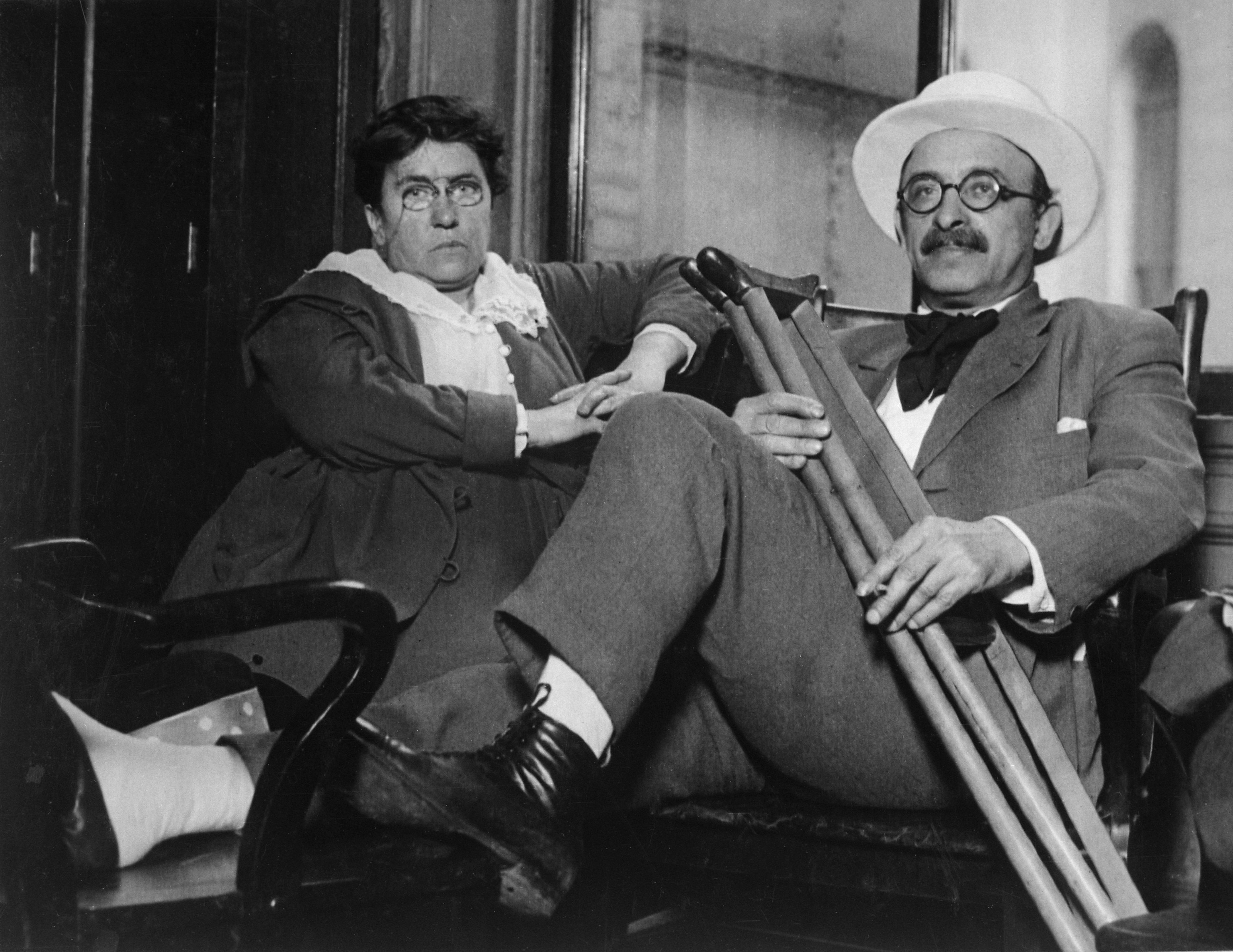
Emma Goldman and Alexander Berkman

In January 1920, Alsberg traveled north, intending to make his way to Moscow; "a believer in the utopia promised by a classless society, [he] wanted to witness and write about those ideals made manifest". After weeks trying to get into Soviet Russia, he finally succeeded in May. In August, he accompanied Emma Goldman and Alexander Berkman (both of whom had been deported to Russia from the United States the previous year) on a six-week expedition to collect historic materials for the Museum of the Revolution. Their accommodations and treatment by the Soviets were luxurious and opulent, but Alsberg was able to get away from the controlled tours to see the disparity between what they were being told and the conditions of the general public. He conceded that "Russia has not now a democratic form of government in any sense of the word", but was still swayed by the framework of the "necessity of extreme measures in order to save the revolution", comparing it to U.S. actions during war when the government found "habeas corpus, free speech, and such-like refinements...superfluous". In Poltava, Ukraine, Emma Goldman acted as interpreter for Alsberg while he interviewed local Soviet officials. In Goldman's autobiography, she noted that Alsberg was particularly affected by the stories that the townspeople in Fastov told them of the pogroms.

For his travels with Goldman and Berkman, Alsberg had obtained written permission from the Soviet Union Foreign Office's Cheka and from a high-ranking Soviet official to travel on the expedition, but did not get a special visa from the local Moscow Cheka. The Foreign Office assured him the Moscow Cheka visa was not needed. But during their travels, orders were sent out to arrest Alsberg for travelling in Russia without having obtained permission from the Moscow Cheka, and he was taken into custody in Zhmerynka. Alsberg managed to get the police agent who escorted him to Moscow drunk on the trip. Arriving at the police station in Moscow carrying the agent, Alsberg set the unconscious body on the desk and said, "Here is the man you sent out to find me."

The following year, Alsberg accompanied the Bolshevik delegation to the Russo-Polish peace talks in Riga, and he wrote about the signing of the armistice. J. Edgar Hoover, head of the newly formed Bureau of Investigation (now the FBI), received voluminous reports on Alsberg due to his involvement with the Bolsheviks, his friendship with Goldman and Berkman, and because he was a Jew. Alsberg continued his association with and work for the JDC, working in Italy with refugees.

In Feb 1921, Alsberg returned to Russia. He was in Moscow during the Kronstadt rebellion, an event which brought him to condemn the Bolshevik regime in the article "Russia: Smoked Glass vs. Rose-Tint" in The Nation. American Max Eastman responded in The Liberator, calling it "journalistic emotionalizing" and declaring Alsberg was "a petit-bourgeois liberal". Alsberg's article was reprinted in New York Call and reported on the front page of the New York Tribune. In all, Alsberg made six trips to Russia, carrying some $10,000 in cash to distribute to Jews in need. In one village, when they heard that soldiers were approaching, village elders dressed Alsberg in an old coat and skullcap as a disguise; he escaped on a ferry to Romania while the soldiers' bullets missed their target.

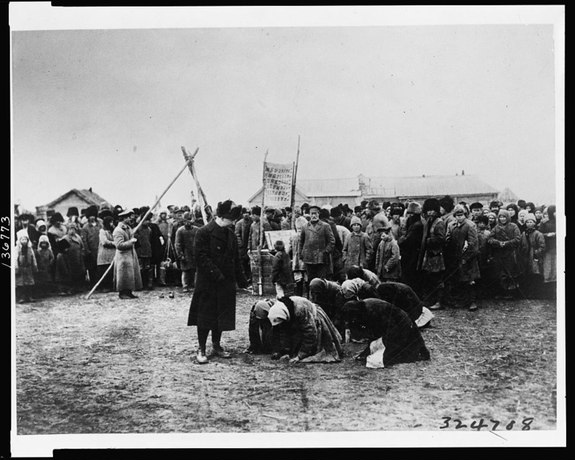
American Relief Administration in Russia, 1922

Alsberg left Russia for Germany in May 1921. In September he went to Mexico to observe and write about the presidency of Álvaro Obregón following the Mexican Revolution. His articles accused the U.S. State Department of "putting into effect a private and unofficial imperialism of its own in Latin America" – accusations which were debated in major newspapers across the U.S. After the famine of 1921, the JDC sent Alsberg back to Russia to help set up trade schools and agricultural colonies for Jewish families.

=== JDC history and theater work ===
The JDC hired Alsberg to write a history of their organization in 1923, which was his first paid work for them. Alsberg submitted a draft in the summer of 1927. Although it was never published, Susan Rubenstein DeMasi wrote: "it still remains as perhaps the most exhaustive account of pre-World War II Central and Eastern European Jewry ever written."

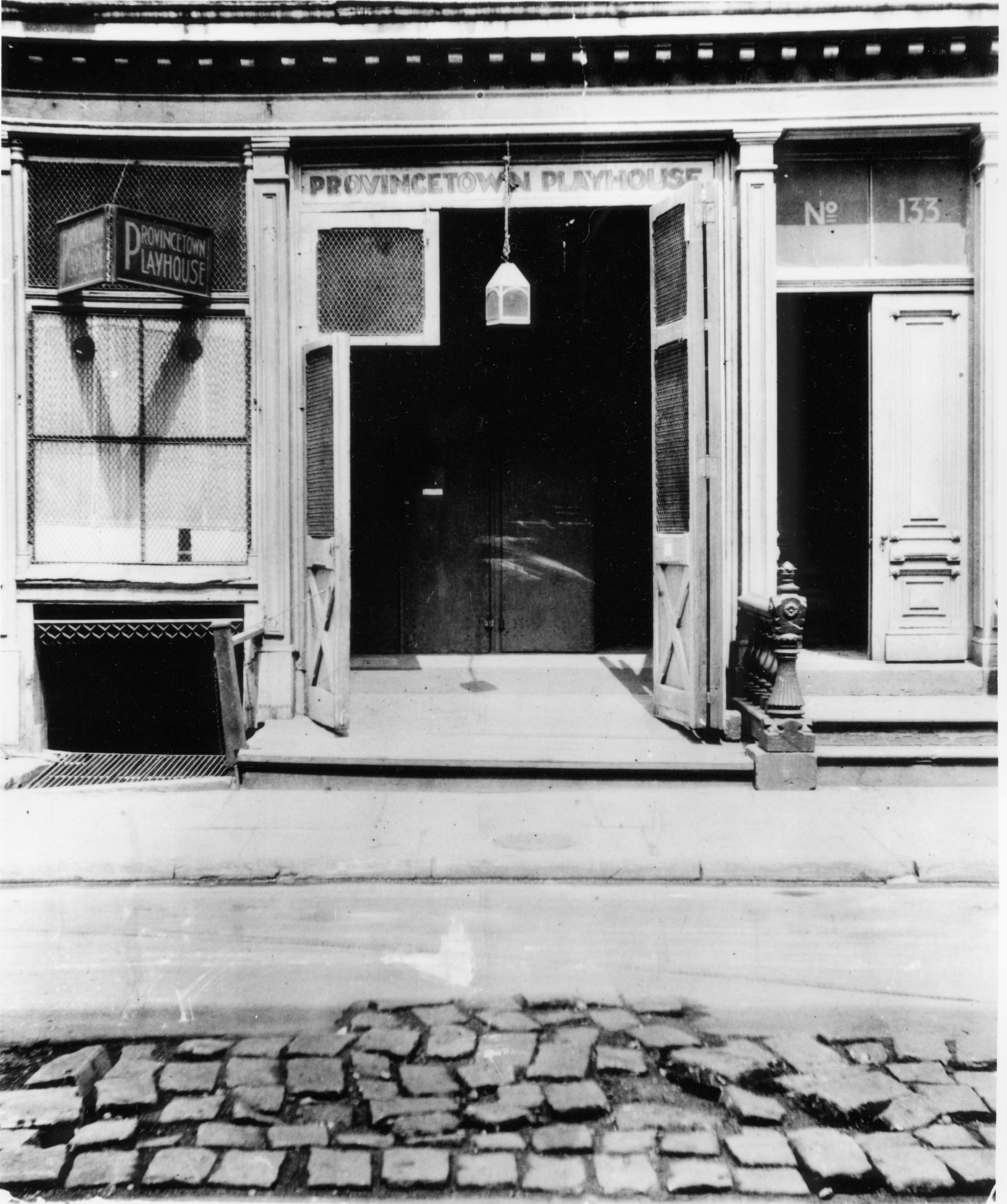
Provincetown Playhouse

Alsberg became involved in the theater during the early 1920s. In 1924, Alsberg obtained the English translation rights to S. Ansky's The Dybbuk, written in Yiddish. His adaptation ran at the off-Broadway Neighborhood Playhouse. The New York Times called his adaptation "a triumph", naming it one of the ten best plays of the 1925–1926 season. Alsberg would continue to earn from productions of his adaptation of The Dybbuk throughout his life.

Alsberg was a director of the Provincetown Playhouse company for the 1925–1926 season, during which he translated and adapted Turandot with Isaac Don Levine. He was associate director of Abraham's Bosom, which won Paul Green a Pulitzer Prize, and producer of Him by E. E. Cummings. George Gershwin asked Alsberg to act as librettist on an opera adaptation of The Dybbuk, to open at the Metropolitan Opera, but was unable to obtain the musical rights.

=== International Committee for Political Prisoners ===
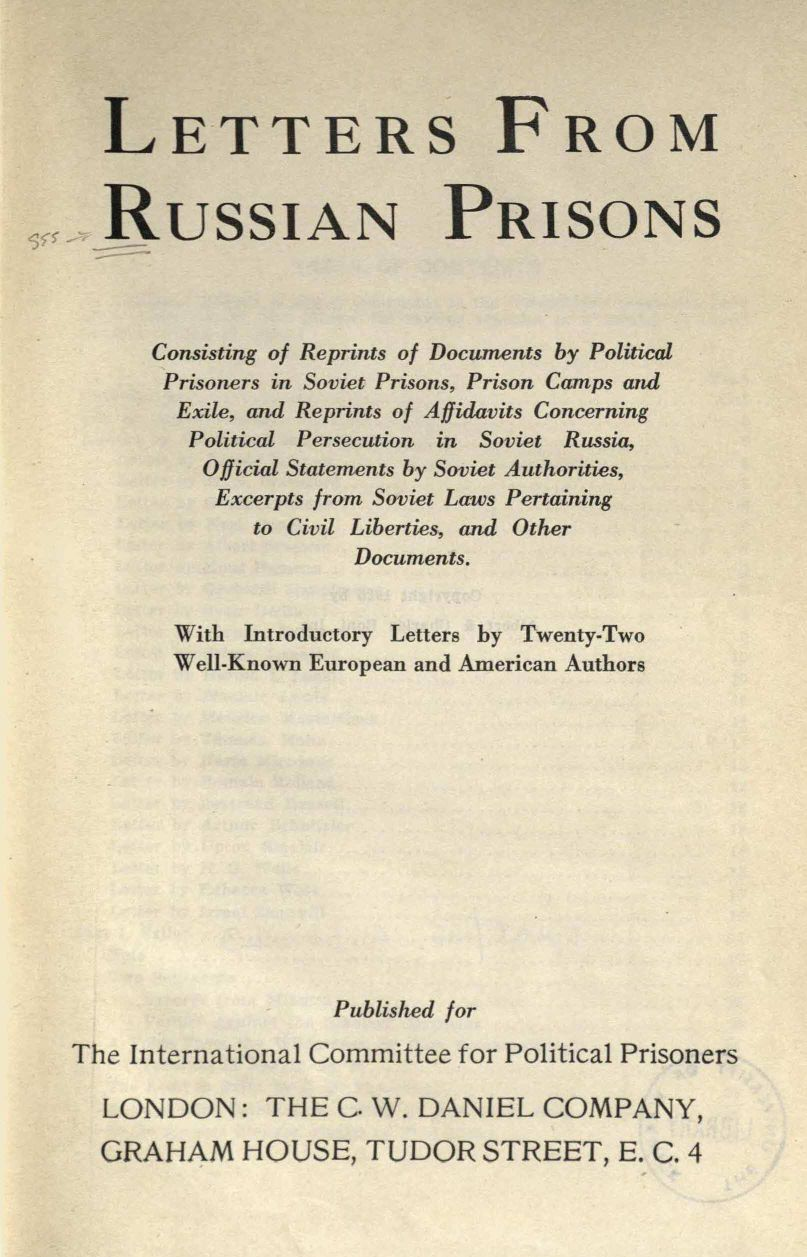
Cover of Letters from Russian Prisons

Alsberg was particularly concerned about the conditions of political prisoners in Russia. He tried to involve the American Civil Liberties Union (ACLU) in his cause, but their charter limited them to domestic issues, so ACLU co-founder Roger Baldwin and Alsberg formed the International Committee for Political Prisoners (ICPP), enlisting people such as Frankfurter, Elizabeth Gurley Flynn, W. E. B. Du Bois, and Carlo Tresca. (Baldwin later described the ICPP as similar to Amnesty International.) Alsberg contributed many documents to and edited Letters from Russian Prisons, and insisted that the title page list all committee members without singling out any individual contributors. The book was intended to bring to international attention the mistreatment that political prisoners in Russia suffered. Some committee members resigned, feeling that the book was too anti-Soviet. Alsberg later gathered material for and edited Political Persecution Today (Poland) and The Fascist Dictatorship (Italy) for the ICPP. Alsberg left the committee by 1928.

Alsberg spent several years traveling in Europe and working on his own writing, including his autobiography which he never finished. In March 1934, he joined the publications division of the Federal Emergency Relief Administration (FERA) where his first assignment was editing America Fights the Depression, a book about the Civil Works Administration's accomplishments. He then took on editing two magazines for the agency.

== Federal Writers' Project ==
The Federal Writers' Project (FWP) was part of Federal One, one of the New Deal Works Progress Administration programs created to provide jobs during the Great Depression. Jacob Baker, chief architect of Federal One, appointed Alsberg as head of the FWP in July 1935. At the time, Alsberg dubbed himself a "philosophical anarchist" although others labelled him a "tired radical of the 20s". On Alsberg's appointment, friends privately questioned the choice as Alsberg was considered to be reluctant to make decisions and often left projects unfinished. Alsberg was not selected as director of the Writers' Project because of any administrative or managerial skill, but rather because of his understanding of the project's purpose and his insistence on high editorial standards for the project's products. Novelist Vincent McHugh classified Alsberg in an elite group: "men with a public sense, a feeling for broad human movements and how people are caught up in them." Baker described Alsberg to an associate as "An anarchistic sort of a fellow incapable of administration but one with a great deal of creative talent".

=== Project leadership ===
Alsberg came to the Writers' Project with a "visionary sense of its potential to join social reform with the democratic renaissance of American letters". His original vision for the project was to produce a guide for each major region of the country, but changed the plans to a guide for each state due to political pressure. Alsberg insisted that the American Guide Series be much more than an American Baedeker; the guides needed to capture the whole of American civilization and culture and celebrate the diversity of the nation. He required that each state project include ethnography with particular attention to Native Americans and African Americans, and that the front third of every guide contain essays on local culture, history, economics, etc.

Alsberg appointed fourteen women as state directors of the project, and 40% of FWP employees were women. First Lady Eleanor Roosevelt was an enthusiastic supporter of the FWP. Two of the writers Alsberg personally recruited to the Writers' Project were John Cheever and Conrad Aiken.

Alsberg felt the American Guide Series needed to be supplemented with books about the people of the country. With this in mind, the project published ethnic studies such as The Italians of New York (in both English and Italian), Jewish Landsmanschaften of New York (in Yiddish), The Armenians of Massachusetts, and The Swedes and Finns of New Jersey. One of Alsberg's letters describes the approach that he wanted the ethnic studies writers to take:

"Get these people loosened up and get them to write about how people in these various groups live. One example of an interesting family and its development from immigrant through first and second generations is worth a whole volume of generalizations based on statistical data."

=== Reception ===
Although the first books in the American Guide Series published under the auspices of the project—Idaho, Washington: City and Capital, and Cape Cod Pilot—were met with praise, the furor that accompanied the release of Massachusetts damaged the reputations of the project and Alsberg. A reporter published a story decrying the Massachusetts guide because it spent forty-one lines discussing the Sacco-Vanzetti case, while only giving nine lines to the Boston Tea Party and five to the Boston Massacre. Other newspapers jumped on the bandwagon to smear the Writers' Project (and the Roosevelt administration by association). Senators demanded investigations. More scrutiny found that the guide had a number of passages that appeared to be pro-labor, and the book was banned by several Massachusetts mayors. Ralph M. Easley, representing a group called the National Civic Federation, complained in a letter to President Roosevelt that the Writer's Project was "dominated by Communist sympathizers whose principal interest was political agitation". After these complaints, WPA administrators placed a worker in the Writers' Project central office to censor "subversive" material.

When Alsberg threw a cocktail party to celebrate the publication of the Washington guide, Alsberg and the Writers' Project were attacked on the Senate floor by Mississippi's Senator Bilbo in a tirade because a woman from his own state had been invited to a party that had both white and black guests. Bilbo later had his comments expunged from the Congressional Record.

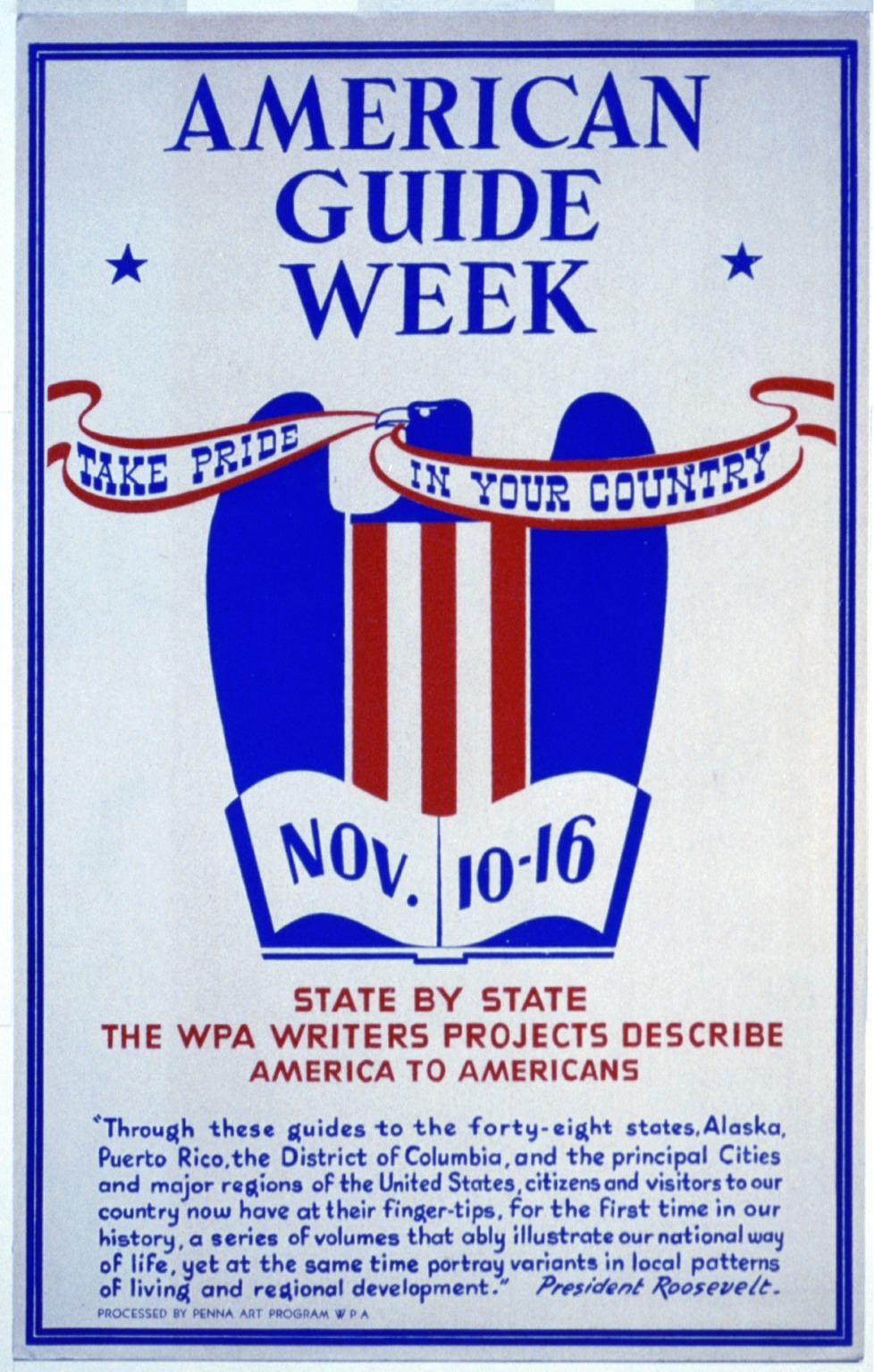
Poster celebrating the American Guide series

Alsberg struggled with the project's tension between providing jobs (relief) and creative works. The American Guide Series was a necessary product to justify the project's existence, but Alsberg sympathized with the many writers who chafed at being confined to writing guidebooks and secretly allowed some project writers to focus on their own creative writing. One of those writers, Richard Wright, used the time to work on his first novel, Native Son, which would become a bestseller when published in 1940. Alsberg also quietly attempted to put out a literary magazine, but the single issue was subject to bickering and resistance from the Writers Union (Stalinists, who insisted that the magazine's editors were Trotskyites). Knowing the Writers' Project was a target of the Dies Committee, Alsberg abandoned the magazine effort and also ended the creative writing program.

=== Dies Committee ===
The Dies Committee was a special investigation committee established by the House Committee on Un-American Activities and chaired by Martin Dies Jr. Aiming to discredit the New Deal by attacking individual projects, Dies claimed that one-third of the Writers' Project's members were Communists. Despite inaccuracies in statements from the committee being widely reported in the press, Alsberg's superiors refused him permission to issue any statements refuting the charges. Alsberg was called to testify before the committee December 6, 1938, after months of requesting a hearing. In Alsberg's testimony, he emphasized his anti-Communist views and stated that he had to "clean up" the Writer's Project, going so far as to threaten to shut it down at the mention of strikes. Unfortunately, these statements reinforced the committee's suspicions that many Communists were part of the project. Within the project, liberals felt Alsberg had been too deferential toward the committee, while conservatives felt the committee had gone too easy on Alsberg. Numerous co-workers said his testimony was brilliant, but Alsberg wanted to resign afterward. Despite Dies's compliments to Alsberg on his testimony, the committee condemned the Writers' Project.

In 1939, Congress cut the WPA budget, and 6,000 were laid off from Federal One. The FWP was then investigated by Clifton Woodrum's House subcommittee on appropriations, which attacked a letter to the editor Alsberg had written ten years previously about conditions in prisons. The Emergency Relief Appropriation Act of 1939 cut funding and required the FWP, now renamed the Writers' Program, to obtain state sponsorship for its projects. The new head of the WPA, Francis C. Harrington, demanded Alsberg's resignation. Alsberg refused to resign immediately, continuing to work on state sponsorships and works in progress. When Alsberg continued working past the August 1 deadline that Harrington set, he was fired. The liberal press was indignant, with The Nation writing "The dismissal looks too much like a living sacrifice on the altar of Messrs. Dies and Woodrum and the Red-baiting they represent".

Under Alsberg's leadership, the Writer's Project had produced over 200 books of more than 20 million words. Lewis Mumford praised the guidebooks as "the finest contribution to American patriotism that has been made in our generation".

== Later life ==
After leaving the Writers' Project, Alsberg went on a speaking tour for the American Association of Colleges, presenting "Adventures in Journalism and Literature". He continued with his political writing, including a piece calling for "an all-out effort to defeat the Axis", and worked on a book that would never be published.

In 1942, Alsberg was hired to work at the Office of War Information. Soon after, the Civil Service Commission investigated a claim that Alsberg and a former colleague were involved in an "immoral relationship", which Alsberg denied. In 1943, Dies made a speech in the House of Representatives demanding forty "subversive" employees be fired, naming Alsberg in particular. The Civil Service Commission held a hearing and Alsberg resigned.

Alsberg began work on his book, Let's Talk About the Peace, which would be published after the war in 1945. The book was praised by the Chicago Daily Tribune and The Nation, however the Saturday Review noted that the book "does not suffer from intellectual modesty or any moral humility." He also worked with Eugene O'Neill Jr. to establish a Readers Theater group.

Alsberg took on a project for Hastings House Publishers as editor-in-chief for a one-volume version of the American Guide Series. Alsberg's condensed American Guide series was published in 1949 as The American Guide, and was featured in the Book of the Month Club. The American Guide made The New York Times best-seller list on October 2, 1949. Alsberg continued as an editor at Hastings House for more than a decade.

Alsberg translated and edited Stefan and Friderike Zweig : their correspondence, 1912–1942 in 1954. In 1956, he moved to Mexico, with occasional visits to Palo Alto, and continued to edit for Hastings House. During this period, he worked on his "Mexican stories" (never published) in which he imagined a social climate that accepted homosexuality.

During the last years of his life, Alsberg, who never married, lived in Palo Alto, California, with his sister Elsa. Alsberg died November 1, 1970, after a short illness.

Some of Alsberg's papers are archived at the libraries at the University of Oregon.
