= Letters from Russian Prisons =

1925 book

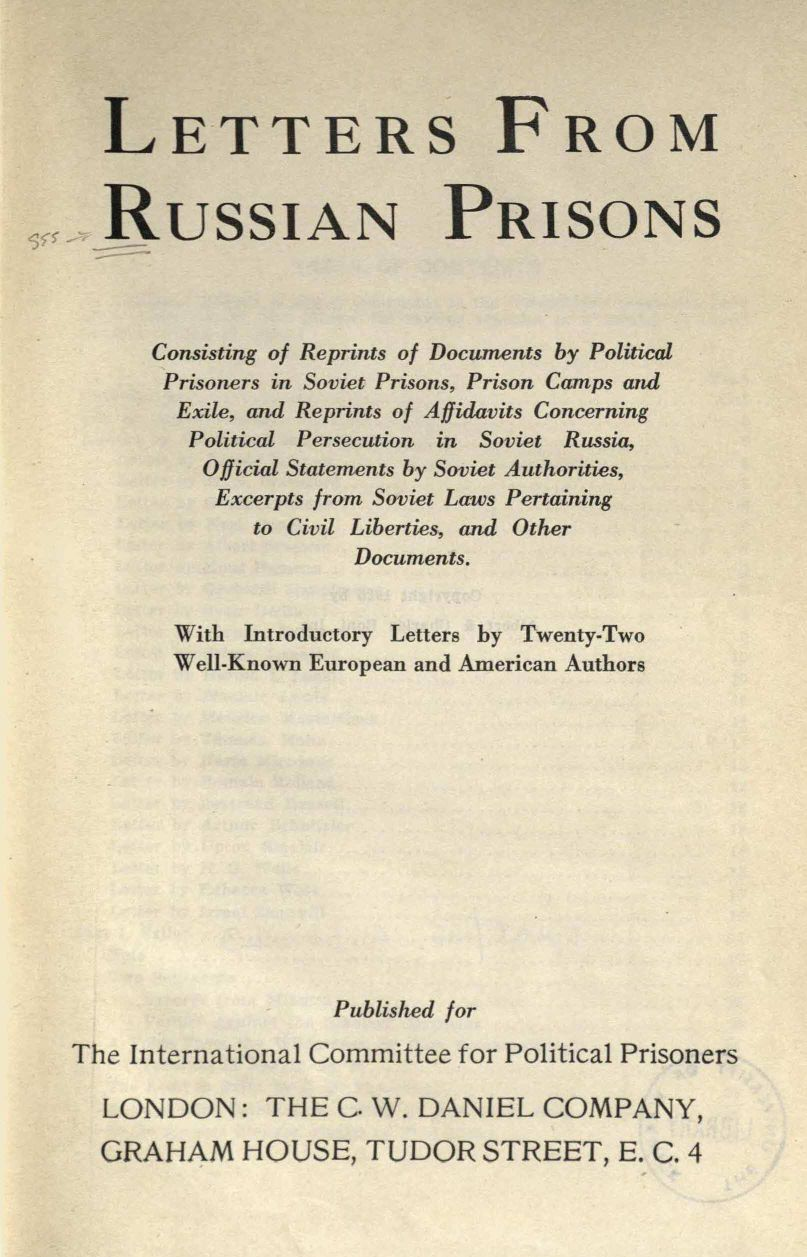
Title page of Letters from Russian Prisons

Letters from Russian Prisons: Consisting of Reprints of Documents by Political Prisoners in Soviet Prisons, Prison Camps and Exile, and Reprints of Affidavits Concerning Political Persecution in Soviet Russia, Official Statements by Soviet Authorities, Excerpts from Soviet Laws Pertaining to Civil Liberties, and Other Documents is a 1925 book by The International Committee for Political Prisoners. It was published in London by the C. W. Daniel Company and in New York by Albert and Charles Boni.

== Contents ==
=== Introduction ===
The book opens with an introduction written by Roger N. Baldwin on behalf of The International Committee for Political Prisoners. In it, he writes "This book attempts to tell the story of these revolutionary political prisoners, chiefly in their own words.... So far as we can get the facts, the prisoners with whom this book deals are intellectuals and working-class revolutionists imprisoned for the expression of their views and for their political activities in holding meetings, speaking, printing, selling their party literature and communicating with their party members and sympathizers abroad."

Baldwin added that "This committee as such approaches the issue of Russian political prisoners without partisan interest, in the belief that the holding of political prisoners by any government blocks progress by stifling ideas and forces necessary for growth."

The International Committee for Political Prisoners reportedly included:

- Roger N. Baldwin, Chairman
- Jane Addams
- Henry G. Alsberg
- Carleton Beals
- Louis B. Boudin
- Max Danish
- Clarence Darrow
- Anna N. Davis
- Eugene V. Debs
- W. E. B. Du Bois
- John Lovejoy Elliott
- Nathalie B. Ells
- Charles W. Ervin
- Elizabeth Gurley Flynn
- John G. Forbath
- Felix Frankfurter
- Lewis Gannett
- Elizabeth Gilman
- Arthur Garfield Hays
- Norman Hapgood
- John Haynes Holmes
- Paul Jones
- David Starr Jordan
- Paul U. Kellogg
- Harry Kelly
- Emil Lengyel
- Robert Morss Lovett
- Julian W. Mack
- James H. Maurer
- David Mitrany
- S. E. Morison
- Fremont Older
- John A. Ryan
- Nevin Sayre
- Alexander S. Tardos
- Graham R. Taylor
- Norman Thomas
- Girolamo Valenti
- Ernesto Valentini
- Oswald Garrison Villard
- B, Charney Vladeck

=== Letters from Celebrated Intellectuals ===
The introduction is followed by a series of letters from "celebrated intellectuals". The content of these varied from Brandes', "Not a day passes that I do not receive fifty letters insisting on answers. Try to understand. My day is filled with necessary work. Sixty or seventy are asking all day long by letter or in personally an hour of my time. It is enough to drive me mad" to Einstein's "All serious people should be under obligation to the editor of these documents" to Russell's "The holders of power in Russia, as elsewhere, are practical men, prepared to inflict torture upon idealists in order to retain their power."

The "celebrated intellectuals" were:

- Arnold Bennett
- H. N. Brailsford
- Georg Brandes
- Karel Čapek
- Albert Einstein
- Knut Hamsun
- Gerhardt Hauptmann
- Sven Hedin
- Bernard Kellerman
- Selma Lagerlöf
- Harold Laski
- Sinclair Lewis
- Maurice Maeterlinck
- Thomas Mann
- Karin Michaëlis
- Romain Rolland
- Bertrand Russell
- Arthur Schnitzler
- Upton Sinclair
- H. G. Wells
- Rebecca West
- Izrael Zangwill

=== "Exile", "Letters from Prison", and "The Northern Camps" ===
The next three sections, "Exile", "Letters from Prison", and "The Northern Camps", are collections of letters, mostly from anarchists, syndicalists, and socialist revolutionaries, who had been exiled from Russia, imprisoned, or sent to forced labor camps (gulags).

=== Civil Liberties and Administration of Justice and Prisons ===
The succeeding section, "Documents Concerning Civil Liberties and Administration of Justice and Prisons", is made up of various documents. Most were produced by prisoners, although the section includes an open letter from Vera Figner, an appeal to Lenin by the group associated with Golos Truda (supported by Alexander Berkman and Emma Goldman, who were then in the Soviet Union) and Trotsky's reply, and "Rules for Prisoners of the Inner Prison of the Vetcheka" by the OGPU (the Soviet secret police, successors to the Cheka). The documents concern conduct in the prisons, the use of hunger strikes by prisoners, prisoners' right to choose public defenders, imprisonment without trial, political repression of opponents of the Soviet regime, and related topics.

=== Questionnaires ===
This section comprises a collection of responses by 44 prisoners to questionnaires circulated among them in an attempt to learn more about their political backgrounds (Mensheviks, 12; Zionist-Socialists, 16; Socialist-Revolutionists, 4; Left Socialist Revolutionists, 3; Anarchists, 7; Non-Partisan, 2), their ages and gender, how often they had been arrested (on average, more than three times), and other relevant information about them. Of the 44, for example, "only a few" had faced trial, "very few" had access to counsel, and "many" had been sentenced without any formal hearing although "more recently" a magistrate or board had examined evidence and passed sentence. In one case, a prisoner was given his sentence in written form.

=== Laws and Regulations ===
The final section, "Excerpts from Laws and Regulations", is a collection of excerpts from various applicable Soviet laws.
