= Hubert Hamer =

American government official

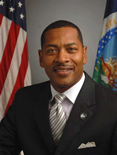

Administrator of the National Agricultural Statistics Service
- Incumbent
- Assumed office April 2016
- President: Barack Obama; Donald Trump; Joe Biden
- Preceded by: Joseph T. Reilly

Personal details
- Education: Tennessee State University (BA)

Hubert Hamer is the top official of the U.S. National Agricultural Statistics Service (NASS), the agency that produces most official U.S. government statistics on agriculture and food.

Hamer has been at NASS since the 1990s and was made Administrator in 2016. He had worked in several field offices, then became an administrator of field offices, then became director of NASS's Statistics Division and chair of the USDA's Agricultural Statistics Board. He is NASS's first African-American administrator.

== Early life and education ==
Hamer grew up on a farm in Benton County, Mississippi and later lived in Grand Junction, Tennessee. He received a bachelor's degree from Tennessee State University in agricultural science in 1980.
