= Marcelle Lively Hamer =

American librarian and folklorist

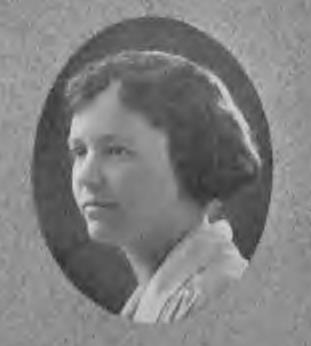
- Born: July 14, 1900; Whitewright
- Died: March 4, 1974 (aged 73)

Elizabeth Marcelle Lively Hamer (July 14, 1900 – March 4, 1974) was an American librarian and folklorist. Her career spanned more than thirty years at the University of Texas and the El Paso Public Library, where she was an expert in Texas folklore and history. She served for seventeen years as the treasurer of the Texas Folklore Society.

== Early life and education ==
Elizabeth Marcelle Lively was born in Whitewright, Texas, on July 14, 1900. Her parents were Robert Morris, a banker and merchant, and Clara Susan (Lemmon) Lively, an English teacher at Grayson College. Marcelle attended a year of school at women's conservatory Kidd-Key College, then completed her secondary schooling at Southeastern State Normal.

In 1919 she earned a two-year degree from Christian College, where she was president of the student body. Hamer received her bachelor's degree in English in 1921 from the University of Oklahoma; she later earned a master's degree from the University of Texas in 1939. Her masters thesis, Anecdotal Elements in Southwestern Literature, was described as "the most dog-eared volume in the University of Texas' collection" in a 1943 Life magazine article on Texas tall tales.

She married Robert Coit Hamer in 1922; they had one daughter, Mary Marcelle Hamer Hull, and divorced in 1930.

== Library career ==
Hamer was the director of the Texas Collection at the University of Texas from 1935 to 1955. The imposing Battle Hall Reading Room served as Hamer's office.

She was hired as a reference assistant at the El Paso Public Library in 1955. She expanded the collections in the library's Southwest Reference Department, which Maud Durlin Sullivan had started in 1929. At her retirement in 1965, she shared the department's most frequently asked about topics in an El Paso Herald-Post article, describing how the staff answered questions about Pancho Villa, Billy the Kid, and John Wesley Hardin from all over the United States.

After her retirement, Hamer moved to Fort Worth and worked for a short time at the Texas Christian University's Mary Couts Burnett Library.

== Scholarship and service ==
Hamer studied and wrote about Texas history, politics, and folklore for journals such as the Southwestern Historical Quarterly and the Frontier Times. One of her most popular writings, "Anecdotes as Sidelights to Texas History," was published in a 1939 Texas Folklore Society publication titled In the Shadow of History. She compiled and wrote the first publication on the Texas Governor's Mansion, a thirteen-page brochure, in 1937.

She was the treasurer of the Texas Folklore Society from 1934 until her resignation in 1951. Described by one of the society's later secretary-editors as "an indispensable part of the Texas Folklore Society during its most vital years," Hamer served as the organization's corresponding secretary, assistant editor, and was left in charge of the business of the society when secretary-editor J. Frank Dobie was "off a-wandering."

She was elected as a life member and historian of the Trail Drivers Association of the Southwest in 1939.

Hamer died on March 4, 1974, and was buried at Oakhill Cemetery in Whitewright.
