= Frank Hamer (British Army officer) =

British Army officer (1919–2009)

- Born: 25 June 1919; Bolton, Lancashire
- Died: 2 April 2009 (aged 89) Hertford
- Allegiance: United Kingdom
- Branch: British Army
- Service years: 1939–1946
- Rank: Major
- Conflicts: Second World War
- Awards: Military Cross with Bar

Major Frank Hamer MC with Bar (25 June 1919 – 2 April 2009) was a British Army officer and group personnel director of Cadbury Schweppes.

== Early life ==
He was educated at Bolton School and St Catharine's College, Cambridge.

== During The War ==
Hamer was awarded his first MC at the Second Battle of El Alamein while a lieutenant in the 4th Durham Survey Regiment RA.

He was awarded the bar to his MC after the invasion of Sicily while surveying German positions.

== After The War ==
Hamer returned to Cambridge and finished off his studies also collecting a Blue for soccer, to go with his freshman Blue in athletics he gained before the war. After his studies he moved to Birmingham taking a job at Cadbury, ending his career as the group personnel director of Cadbury Schweppes.
