= Elizabeth Hamer Kegan =

American archivist and historian

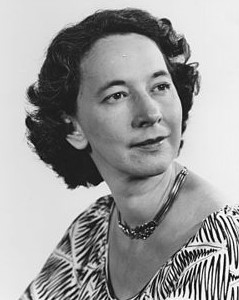
- Born: May Elizabeth Edwards; Copperhill, Tennessee, U.S.
- Died: Alexandria, Virginia, U.S.
- Other names: Elizabeth Hamer
- Occupation: Assistant Librarian of Congress

Elizabeth "Betty" Edwards Hamer Kegan (January 4, 1912 – March 9, 1979) was an American archivist and librarian, and served as the Assistant Librarian of Congress from 1963 to 1978. She was a founding member of the Society of American Archivists (SAA) in 1936 and was President of SAA from 1975 to 1976.

== Career ==
Elizabeth Edwards was born in Copperhill, Tennessee, and completed her undergraduate studies at the University of Tennessee in 1933. After graduation she did graduate work in history before joining the staff of the National Archives in 1936. At the archives she worked as an editor for the Survey of Federal Records, with her work being so impressive that she was soon promoted to editor in chief. The project was compiled and published as the Inventory of Federal Archives in the States. In 1940, she married fellow archivist Philip M. Hamer, who was the Chief of Reference at the National Archives.

In 1947, she became the Exhibits and Information Officer and three years later, was promoted to the position of Chief of the Exhibits and Publications Section. In 1951 she left the National Archives and became the publications and information officer at the Library of Congress, rising to the positions of Assistant Librarian for Public Affairs in 1960 and Assistant Librarian of Congress in 1963. She was a lead supporter of the Freedom Train and sought to make archives more accessible to the general public. She was responsible for acquiring the documents for the Freedom Train exhibit, from the Library of Congress, museums, the National Archives, and private collections. She assisted in the displays and installation of the exhibit as well.

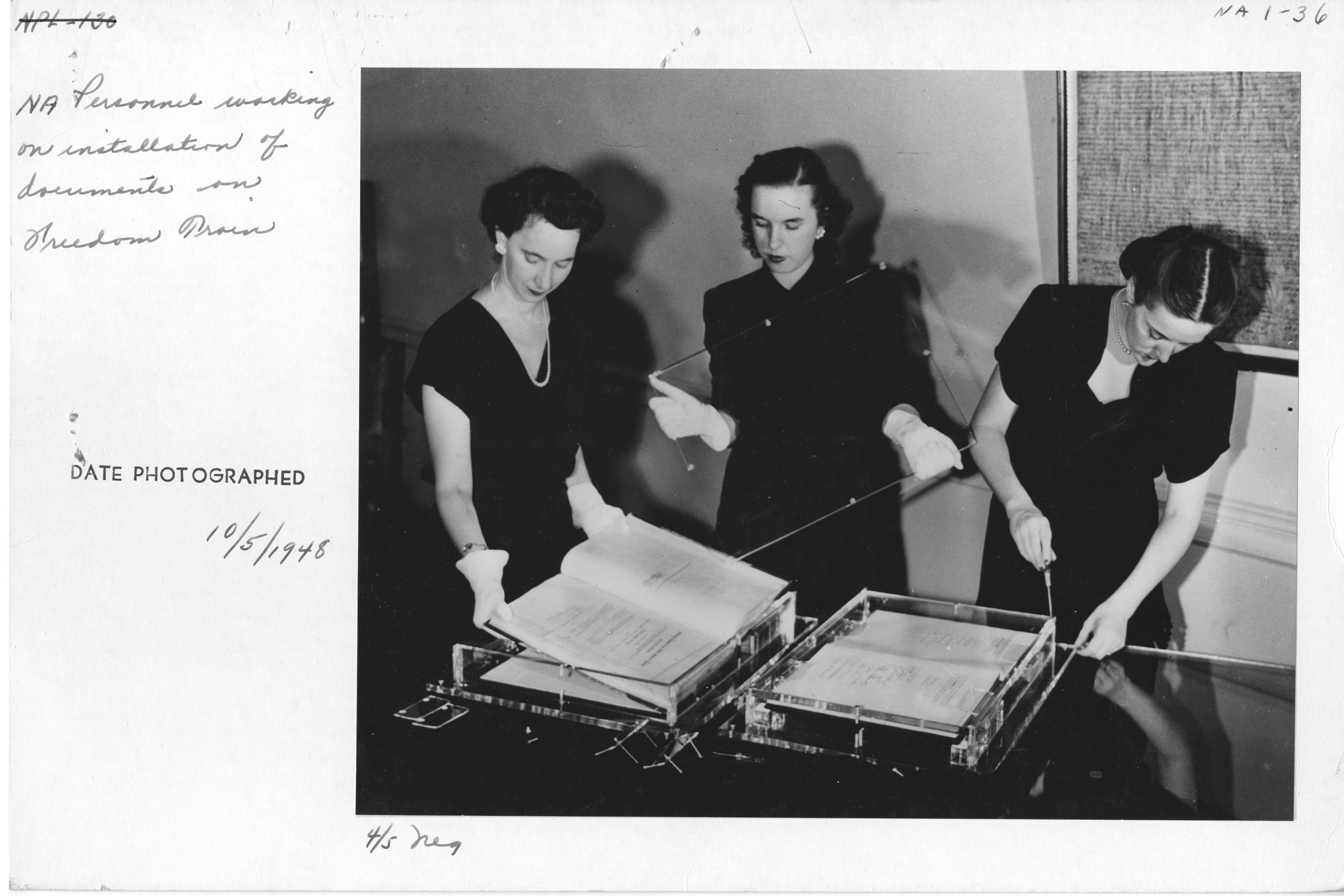
Left to Right: Elizabeth Hamer, Margaret (Peggy) Mangum, and Elizabeth Bukowsky put volumes in Lucite containers aboard the Freedom Train.

After Philip Hamer's death in 1971, she married Lawrence Robert Kegan. She retired from the library in 1978.

Throughout her career, Hamer Kegan remained involved in professional organizations in the history, archives, and library communities. She was a founding member of the Society of American Archivists in 1936, and later served on Council from 1969 to 1973, Vice President in 1974, and as president from 1975 to 1976. She was also elected and awarded as an SAA Fellow in 1960.

Hamer Kegan died in Bethesda, Maryland, on March 9, 1979.

In 1973, the Society of American Archivists established the Philip M. Hamer and Elizabether Hamer Kegan Award. The award was created to be given to an individual, group or institution that has raised public awareness of history and archives through an exhibit or display.
