= Carl L. Alsberg =

American chemist (1877–1940)

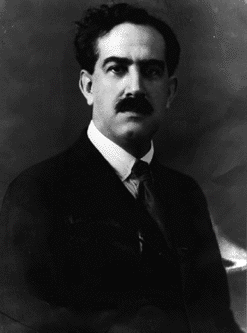

2nd Commissioner of Food and Drugs
- In office December 16, 1912 – July 15, 1921
- President: William Howard Taft; Woodrow Wilson; Warren G. Harding
- Preceded by: Harvey Washington Wiley
- Succeeded by: Walter G. Campbell

Personal details
- Born: Carl Lucas Alsberg; April 2, 1877 New York City, New York, U.S.
- Died: October 31, 1940 (aged 63) Berkeley, California, U.S.
- Party: Republican
- Spouse: Emma Alsberg
- Relatives: Henry Alsberg (brother)
- Education: Columbia College

Carl L. Alsberg (April 2, 1877 – October 31, 1940) was an American chemist who served as Commissioner of Food and Drugs from 1912 to 1921.

Alsberg was born to a secular German-Jewish family, the oldest of four children. His father Meinhard, a chemist who immigrated to the U.S. from Germany in 1865, was a founder of the American Chemical Society. Carl Alsberg attended Columbia University, where was a member of the Philolexian Society, and founded a literary magazine, The Morningside. He graduated from Columbia College in 1896. He spent three years (1900–1903) studying in Germany before taking up a position as an instructor in biological chemistry at Harvard University.

After teaching at Harvard, Alsberg went to work for the U.S. government in 1908, and from 1912 to 1920 served as Chief of the United States Bureau of Chemistry, which would be renamed the Food and Drug Administration. In that role, Alsberg pursued an investigation into pepper adulteration at McCormick & Company which resulted in a fine and a court order that the company must label its product as "ground black pepper containing from 10 percent to 28 percent added pepper shells". Alsberg also investigated Monsanto's use of saccharin and the amount of caffeine in Coca-Cola.

In 1921, Alsberg resigned from the Bureau of Chemistry and co-founded Stanford University's Food Research Institute.

In 1937, he took a position at the University of California, Berkeley. In 1940, after visiting family in New York, Alsberg became ill with pneumonia on the train trip back to California and died in the hospital on October 31.
