= Philip M. Hamer =

American archivist and historian

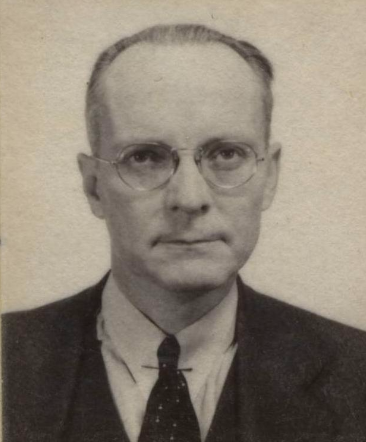
- Close-up image from Hamer's National Archives identification card, 1941.
- Born: Philip May Hamer; November 10, 1891; Marion, South Carolina, U.S.
- Died: April 10, 1971 (aged 79); Maryland
- Occupations: Director, National Historical Publications Commission

Philip May Hamer (November 10, 1891 – April 10, 1971) was an American archivist and historian, and served as the executive director of the National Historical Publications Commission from 1951 to 1961.

Hamer was born in Marion, South Carolina, in 1891 and demonstrated an early interest in historical studies. He received his undergraduate degree at Wofford College and his master's degree at Trinity College in South Carolina. He then pursued a Ph.D. in history at the University of Pennsylvania at Philadelphia, which he completed in 1918 with a dissertation on South Carolina succession. After graduation, he worked for fifteen years as a history professor at the University of Chattanooga and the University of Tennessee.

Hamer joined the staff of the National Archives in 1935, and the following year was appointed the director of the WPA Historical Records Survey's Survey of Federal Records. He later served as a division head for library services, reference, and records control. In 1950 Hamer was selected to serve as the executive director of the National Historical Publications Commission, where he served until his retirement in 1961. During his time at the National Archives he married fellow archivist Elizabeth Edwards in 1940.

In addition to his work at the National Archives, Hamer was also involved in professional service in the disciplines of archives and history. He helped found the Southern Historical Association, and served as president of that organization in 1938. He later served as president of the Society of American Archivists from 1960 to 1961.
