= John Hamer (footballer) =

English footballer

Personal information
- Date of birth: 5 April 1944 (age 82)
- Place of birth: Bradford, England
- Position: Left half

Senior career*
Years	Team	Apps	(Gls)
1964–1965	Bradford City	1	(0)
- Harrogate Railway Athletic
- * Club domestic league appearances and goals

John Hamer (born 5 April 1944) is an English former professional footballer who played as a left half.

== Career ==
Born in Bradford, Hamer played for Bradford City and Harrogate Railway Athletic.

For Bradford City he made 1 appearance in the Football League.

== Sources ==
- Frost, Terry (1988). Bradford City A Complete Record 1903-1988. Breedon Books Sport. ISBN 0-907969-38-0.
