= Francis C. Harrington =

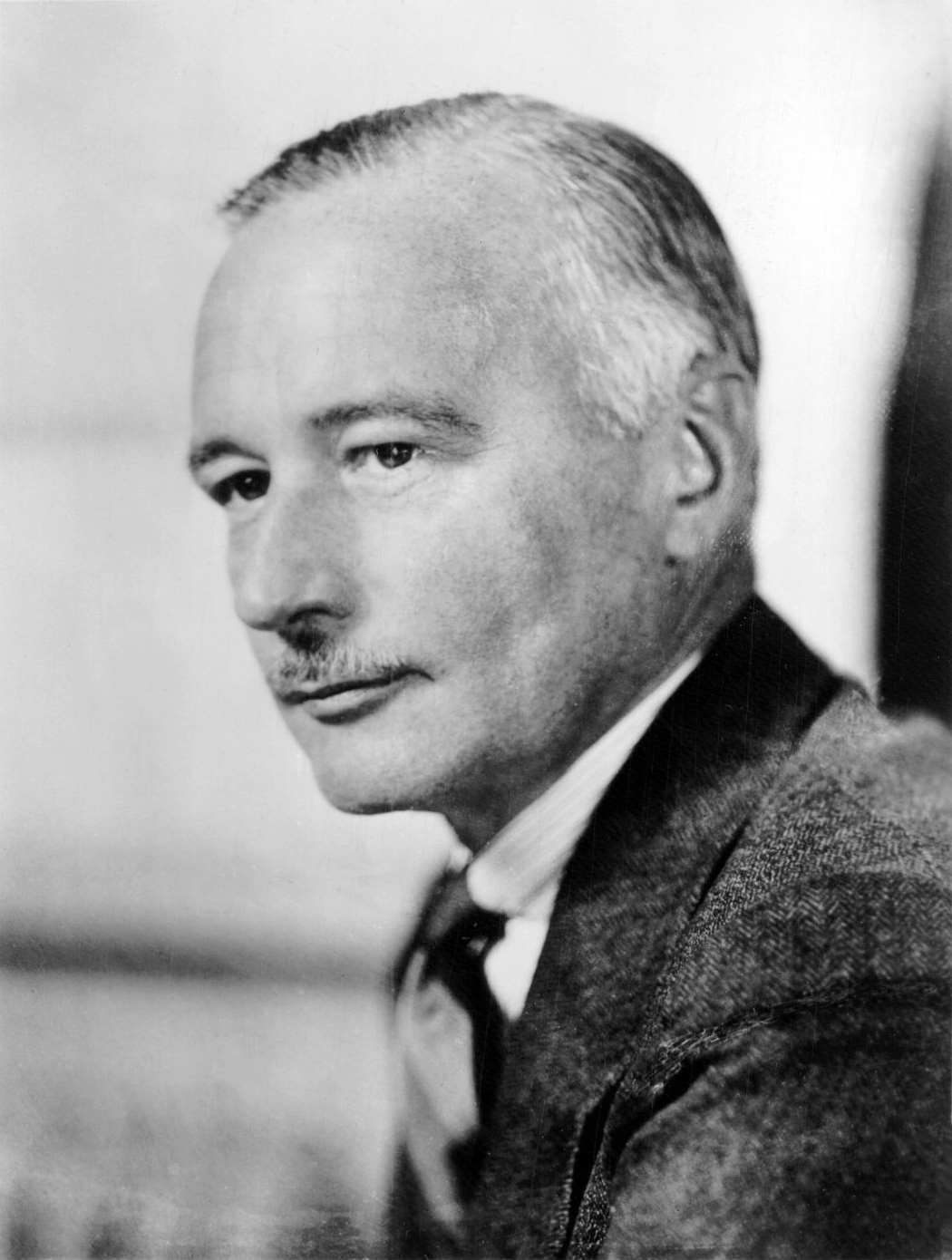

Commissioner of Work Projects
- In office July 1, 1939 – September 30, 1940
- President: Franklin D. Roosevelt
- Preceded by: Himself (Administrator)
- Succeeded by: Howard O. Hunter

Administrator of the Works Progress Administration
- In office December 24, 1938 – July 1, 1939
- President: Franklin D. Roosevelt
- Preceded by: Harry Hopkins
- Succeeded by: Himself (Commissioner)

Personal details
- Born: September 10, 1887 Bristol, Virginia, U.S.
- Died: September 30, 1940 (aged 53) New London, Connecticut, U.S.
- Resting place: West Point Cemetery
- Spouse: Eleanor Crozier Reyburn (m. 1915; died 1938)
- Children: William Stuart; Mary Eleanor
- Education: Virginia Military Institute; United States Military Academy

Military service
- Allegiance: United States
- Branch/service: United States Army
- Years of service: 1909–1940
- Rank: Colonel
- Unit: Army Corps of Engineers
- Awards: Army Distinguished Service Medal

Francis Clark Harrington (September 10, 1887 – September 30, 1940) was a colonel in the US Army Corps of Engineers and administrator of the Works Progress Administration (WPA) under President Franklin D. Roosevelt during the Great Depression.

== Career ==
Harrington attended the Virginia Military Institute and then graduated from West Point in 1909 as second in his class. After US Army Engineer School and several teaching posts, he served as chief engineer for the Panama Canal, gaining valuable experience in supervising labor on a large scale. Harrington graduated from the Command and General Staff School in 1928 and the Army War College in 1929. He then spent four years on the War Department General Staff (1929–1933), and two years in Paris at the École de Guerre, graduating from the école supérieure de guerre in 1935, before returning to Washington to assist with the formation of the WPA.

Alongside Harry Hopkins, Colonel Harrington served as Chief Engineer and Assistant Commissioner of the WPA, helping to structure and manage the massive new organization. Hopkins remarked on his impact: "[Harrington's] good judgment, clear vision, and capacity for organizing for a huge task have left a mark in the field of government administration which will be more and more appreciated as time passes."

When Hopkins became Commerce Secretary in 1938, FDR appointed Colonel Harrington as WPA Commissioner. At a time when the WPA and other New Deal programs were under intensifying political pressure, Colonel Harrington, a respected nonpartisan figure, offered FDR a politically safe choice. Colonel Harrington served as WPA Commissioner until his death in 1940 at age 53. Under Harrington's leadership, the WPA employed 8.5 million people on 1.4 million projects, including 651,097 miles of highways and roads, 124,011 bridges, 39,397 schools, and 953 airports, helping to stimulate the American economy and improve communities around the country.

Colonel Harrington's obituary in The Evening Star reads:

To many of those who knew him, Colonel Harrington typified the ideal public servant. A man of great personal charm, he had disciplined himself to approach any task with an objective detachment which is so essential, but often lacking, in the administration of public affairs... He was a credit to the ideals and training of the Army. Men of this type are hard to replace.

FDR stated, "The whole country has sustained a very great loss in the death of Colonel Harrington."

== Personal life ==
Colonel Harrington was born in Bristol, Virginia, on September 10, 1887 to William Harrington and Victoria Gautier.

In June 1915, Harrington married Eleanor Crozier Reyburn of Philadelphia, daughter of John E. Reyburn, former US Congressman and Mayor of Philadelphia, and granddaughter of Robert Crozier, former US Attorney and US Senator from Kansas. He and his wife lived in Washington, D.C., and had two children: William Stuart (born in 1918, and graduated from Yale in 1939) and Mary Eleanor (born in 1928, and graduated from Barnard College in 1952).

An avid poker player and horseracing fan, Harrington joked that betting on the famous horse War Admiral put his children through school.

In 1938, Harrington lost his beloved wife after a long illness. On September 30, 1940, Harrington died at age 53 of a severe internal infection at a hospital in New London, Connecticut, where he had undergone an operation a week prior for an intestinal obstruction. He was buried with full military honors at West Point.

== Honors ==
In 1940, Colonel Harrington was awarded the Army Distinguished Service Medal for

exceptionally meritorious and distinguished service in a duty of great responsibility. As Chief Engineer and later as Administrator of the Works Progress Administration and Commissioner of Work Projects, Colonel Harrington was charged with the planning and administration of the greatest peacetime effort ever undertaken by any bureau or department of the Government. During this period he displayed extraordinary qualities of leadership and unusual talents for administration. As advisor to the President and the Congress his professional counsel was marked by great vigor and vision leading to measures both executive and legislative which contributed directly to the well being of millions and indirectly to the benefit of the entire Nation.

In 1943, a Victory ship built in Maryland was named in honor of Colonel Harrington. The Francis C. Harrington was damaged by a mine off the coast of Normandy in 1944, repaired, and continued to serve as a merchant vessel until 1962.
