= At the Time of the Louisville Flood =

1937 photograph by Margaret Bourke-White

At the Time of the Louisville Flood (1937)

At the Time of the Louisville Flood, also known as World's Highest Standard of Living, is a black-and-white photograph taken in early 1937 by photojournalist Margaret Bourke-White while on assignment for Life. The photo shows Black flood refugees waiting in line for Red Cross relief in the aftermath of the Ohio River flood of 1937 in Louisville. Behind the refugees, a billboard advertisement for the National Association of Manufacturers appears in the background reading, "World's Highest Standard of Living: There's No Way Like the American Way".

It is one of several photos of the Red Cross relief line taken from different angles and one of more than 20 flood-related images Bourke-White produced in the series, only eight of which were originally published in two issues of Life in February of that year. The photo is often recontextualized and used as a symbol of the Great Depression even though it was intended to document the Louisville flood; the photo lacks visual cues about its location and subject, and awareness of its context was lost over time. It is among Bourke-White's most well-known photographs.

Digital and print selections from the series are currently held in several archival collections, including the Life Picture Collection, the Herbert F. Johnson Museum of Art, the New Orleans Museum of Art, and the International Center of Photography, among others. An additional set of photos documenting Bourke-White's work on the series from the perspective of Louisville photographer Corwin Short are held by the University of Louisville.

== Description ==
The image depicts the aftermath of the 1937 Ohio River flood in Kentucky, showing residents from Black neighborhoods in Louisville, (Note: Walker 2009: "[The] African American quarter was completely swamped - and had to be temporarily assisted by Red Cross relief agencies.") including men, women, and children. They wait in line with baskets and pails to receive water, food, and medicine from a Red Cross relief station near 13th and Broadway in the California neighborhood. Behind the queue, a billboard featuring an advertisement from the National Association of Manufacturers (NAM) is visible. It depicts a seemingly happy white middle-class family driving through the countryside. The words "World's Highest Standard of Living" appear across the top of the billboard, while smaller text below reads, "There's No Way Like the American Way!" Of the 18 people depicted in the frame waiting for flood relief, only one appears to be looking at the billboard.

== Background ==
Margaret Bourke-White grew up in a family where her father was an amateur photographer. As a child, she helped him develop photographs, but did not seriously immerse herself in photography until she studied with Clarence White, a founding member of the Photo-Secession movement that promoted photography as fine art. In 1927, she started a commercial photography business in Cleveland producing architectural and industrial photography for corporate clients. The next year, she made a name for herself at the age of 24 with industrial images for the Otis Steel Company.

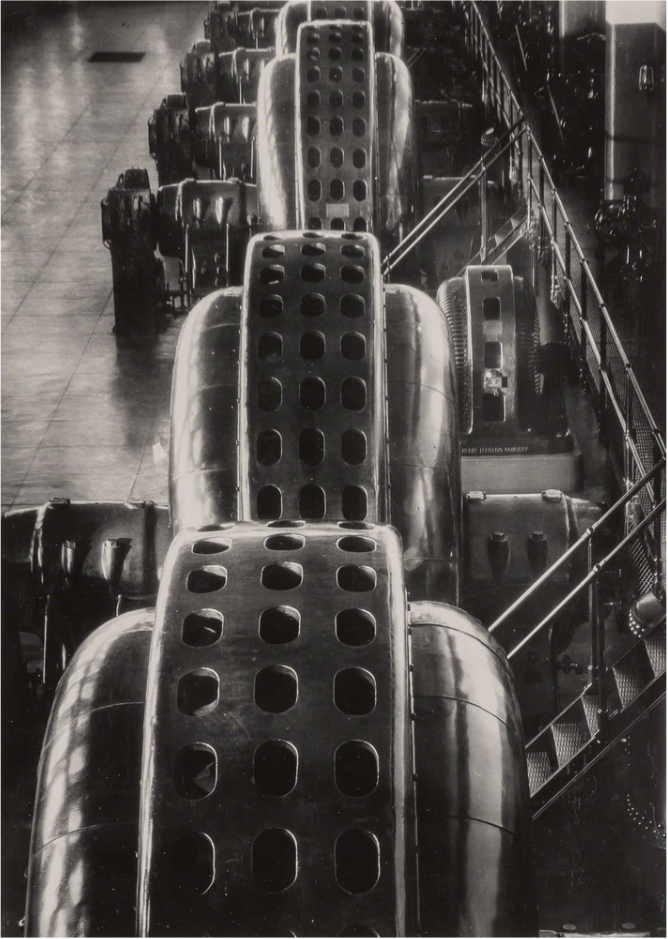
Niagara Falls Power, Cleveland (1928)

Her commercial work got her noticed by American magazine magnate Henry Luce, who recruited her as a photojournalist to the new Fortune magazine, where her interest in documentary photography slowly grew in her new role. At Fortune, she became the first foreign photographer granted official access to document industrial sites in the Soviet Union during the first five-year plan. She visited the country three times on assignment to cover its growing industrialization. During those trips, she photographed workers and peasants alongside the Russian infrastructure.

While her initial interest in documentary photography emerged during her first visit to Russia, the documentary aesthetic of Fortune magazine also played a role. In the summer of 1934, she was on assignment for the magazine, covering the major drought impacting the United States at the time. She produced a photo-essay on the Dust Bowl, (Note: Bourke-White, Margaret (October 1934). "The Drought: A Post-Mortem in Pictures". Fortune. 10 (4): 76–83.; Bourke-White provided the photos for the Fortune article, but the text was written by an uncredited James Agee. She later wrote her own piece on the Dust Bowl for The Nation. See: Bourke-White, Margaret (May 22, 1935). "Dust Changes America". The Nation. 140 (3645): 597–598.) focusing on people as subjects rather than industry. This experience changed her approach to photography, In her autobiography, she recalled the emergence of this new "awareness":

I had never seen people caught helpless like this in total tragedy. They had no defense. They had no plan. [...] I was deeply moved by the suffering I saw and touched particularly by the bewilderment of the farmers. I think this was the beginning of my awareness of people in a human, sympathetic sense as subject for the camera and photographed against a wider canvas than I had perceived before. During the rapturous period when I was discovering the beauty of industrial shapes, people were only incidental to me, and in retrospect I had not much feeling for them in my earlier work. But suddenly it was the people who counted.

Bourke-White began a collaboration with Erskine Caldwell in early 1936 on a project that became You Have Seen Their Faces. She was hired as the first woman photojournalist and staff photographer for the newly formed Life magazine later that year, joining Alfred Eisenstaedt, Peter Stackpole, and Thomas McAvoy. Her photo of Fort Peck Dam appeared on the cover of the first issue.

== Ohio River flood of 1937 ==
The Ohio River flooded in late January 1937 after heavy rain earlier in the month, causing damage along the river and smaller tributaries. Temperatures were cold enough that ice was reported floating along northern portions of the river. Five states were impacted: West Virginia, Ohio, Indiana, Illinois, and Kentucky, with a total of one million left homeless by the flooding.

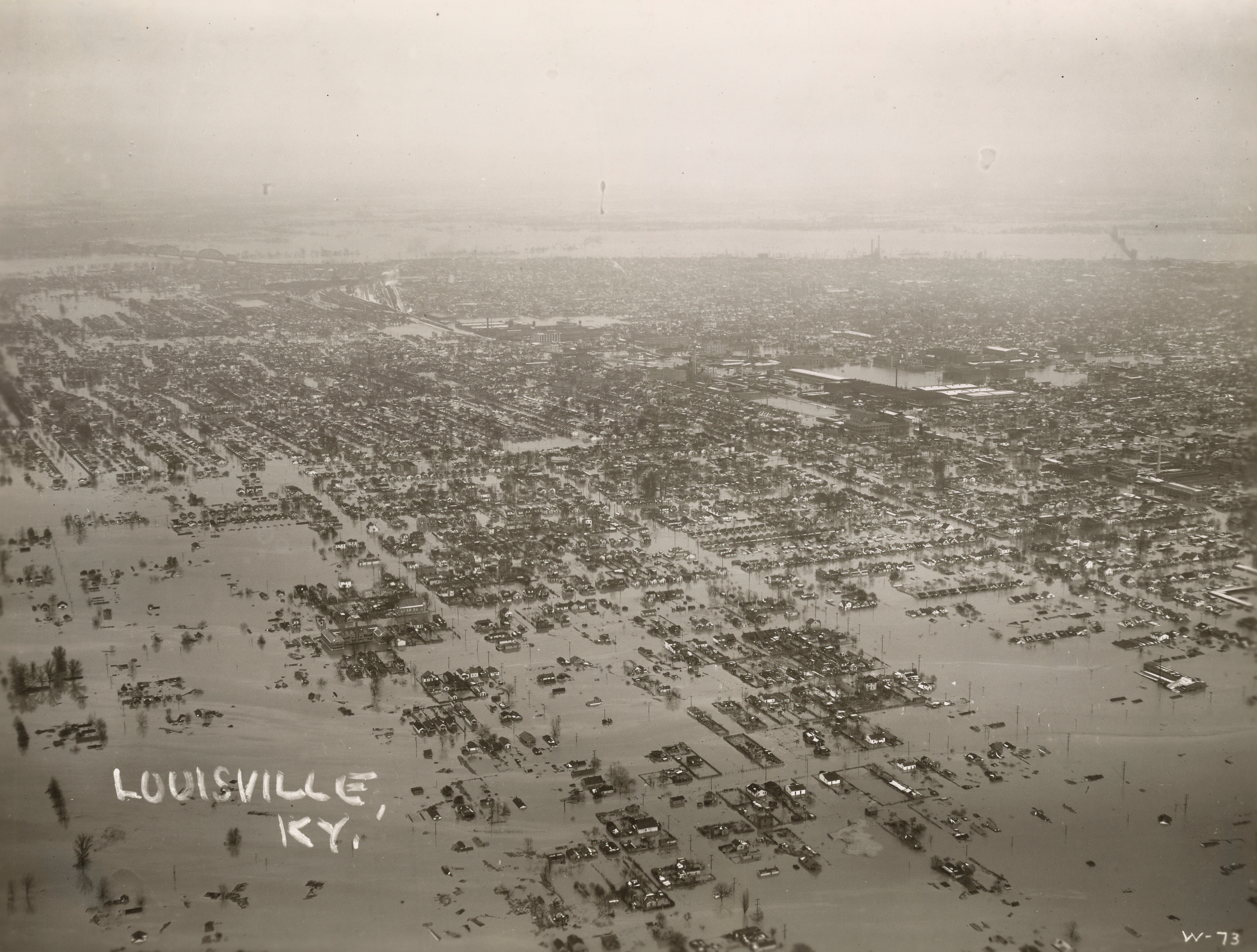
Rising floodwaters on January 25, 1937 (NARA)

The flood destroyed more than half of the city of Louisville, Kentucky, putting seventy percent of the city under water and forcing 175,000 residents out of their homes. Floodwaters reached depths of 10 feet (3.05 m) in the West End and downtown. The flood contributed to the demise of the neighborhoods of Shippingport and The Point.

Flood damage was estimated at $250 million ($5.6 billion in 2025). According to the American Red Cross, it was the greatest natural disaster in the organization's history up to that point. The National Association for the Advancement of Colored People (NAACP) contacted the United States Coast Guard for help, with reports that Black residents were facing discrimination when it came to flood rescues.

== On assignment ==
The Ohio River flood was still breaking news when Bourke-White finished up covering the second inauguration of Franklin D. Roosevelt in Washington, D.C. Life editor Shaw Billings gave Bourke-White an hour to figure out how to get down to Louisville and cover the story. She boarded the final flight and landed at Bowman Field airport in Louisville just before the airfield was submerged some time after January 20. Upon her arrival, she was met by Kentucky native, realtor, and photographer Corwin Short, who was directed by then-mayor of Louisville Neville Miller to guide Bourke-White throughout the flooded city.

They hitchhiked by raft into town, taking several photos along the way. Later, in 1963, Bourke-White recalled: "I thumbed rides in rowboats and once on a large raft. These makeshift craft were bringing food packages and bottles of clean drinking water to marooned families and seeking out survivors. Working from the rowboats gave me good opportunities to record acts of mercy as they occurred."

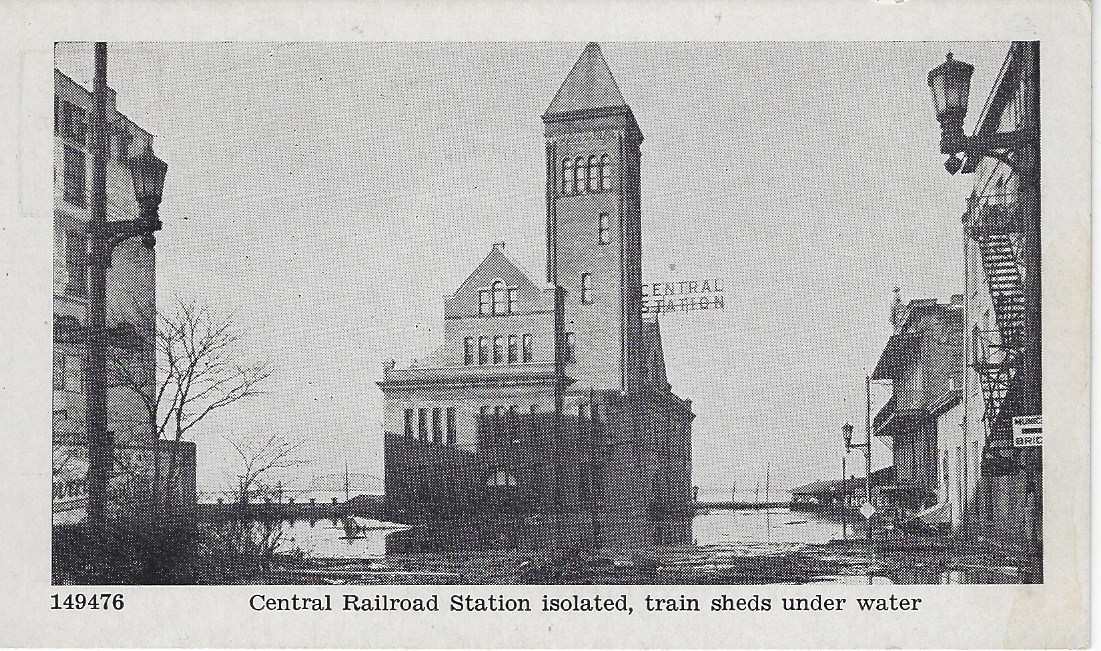
Louisville Central Station surrounded by flood water (Caufield & Shook)

Short captured more than 100 photos of the flood, some featuring Bourke-White at work on her assignment. In one photo, Bourke-White and her camera and tripod are poised on the roof of a car amidst the flood below. Other photos in Short's series show Bourke-White walking along a pontoon bridge and as a passenger in a rowboat.

The offices of The Courier Journal and The Louisville Times at the Old U.S. Customshouse and Post Office building in downtown Louisville became a base of operations for the press, with Bourke-White documenting their efforts to cover the flood, as well as using the offices as a place to sleep. Three of the photos in her series document the newspaper staff, including a group photo showing them working on the latest newspaper edition by the light of kerosene lamps due to the power outage. Two other photos depict editor Tom Wallace and news editor Wilbur B. Cogshall.

Many churches were converted into food distribution and relief centers, often because they were built on higher ground. During her tour of the flood, Bourke-White captured a photo of St. Paul's Episcopal Church, where the pews were used to store canned food that was distributed by the Red Cross. At Churchill Downs, Bourke-White took a photo of the flooded racetrack. Inside the clubhouse, she captured a famous image of Jim Lawhorn, an elderly Black man in his 90s. The photo of Lawhorn, a former slave turned flood refugee, made an impression with the public. In Buechel, Bourke-White visited a relief station at Hikes Grade School, where she photographed a nurse getting ready to inoculate flood refugees against typhoid.

== Original publication ==
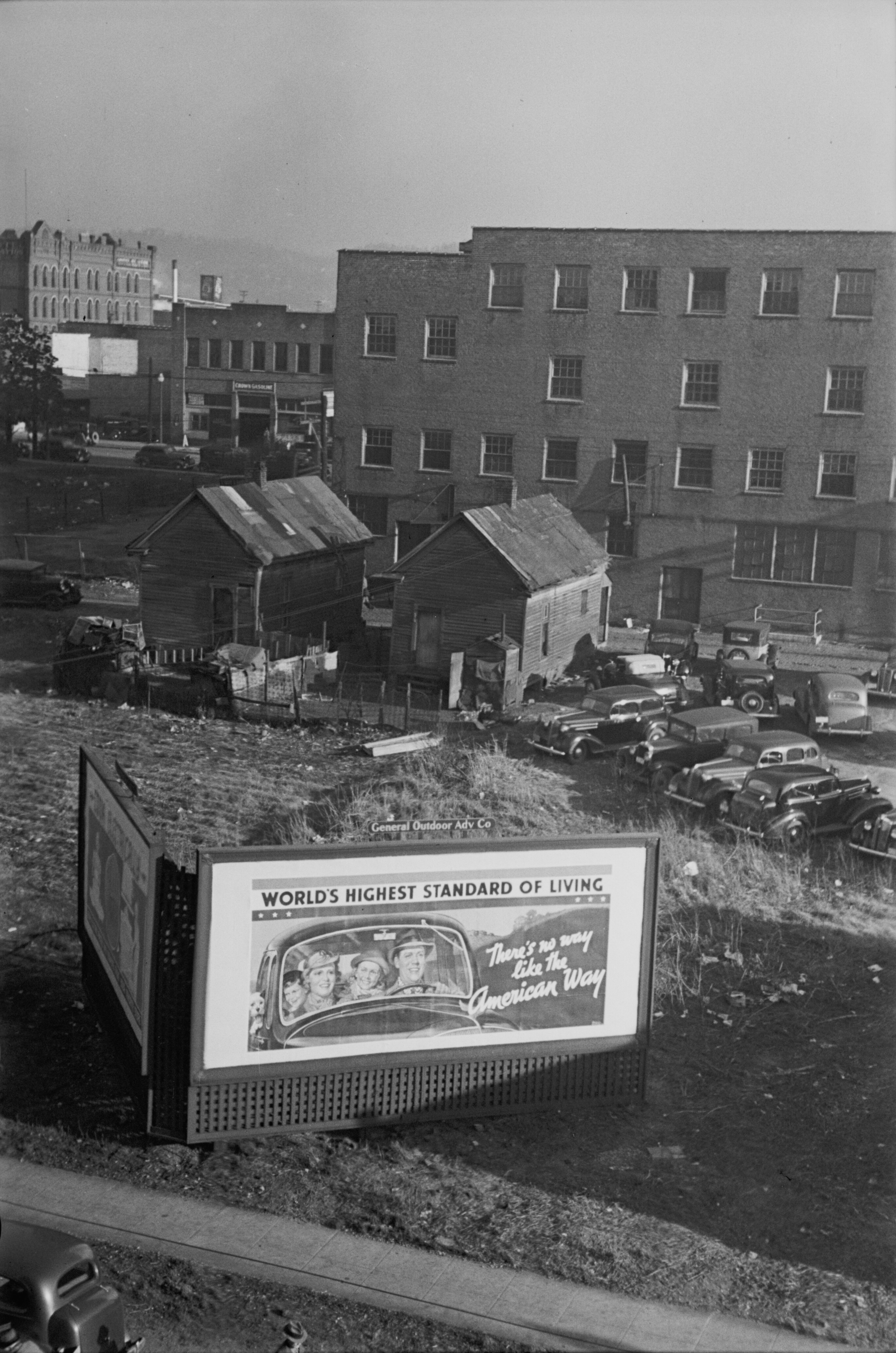
World's Highest Standard of Living (Arthur Rothstein, February 1937), Birmingham, Alabama.

The first photos and coverage of the Ohio River flood published by Life (Note: The titles of Life magazine articles do not appear on the first page of the story, but rather on the table of contents (TOC) page. Luce publications were known for their distinctive editorial style, which often used a short descriptive title in the TOC and a more interpretive headline for the article.) appeared in the February 1, 1937, edition, but Bourke-White was not the photographer, as she was still on assignment at the inauguration of FDR in Washington, with one of her photos of the event in the same edition. Her flood photos were first published in the February 8 issue, beginning with the photo "Baby in Shelter During Flood, Louisville, Kentucky," which appeared prominently in the lead position of the story "Faces in the Flood."

At the Time of the Louisville Flood was first published in the February 15 issue on page nine, two weeks after Life had begun its coverage of the flood. It appeared as the lead photograph in a seven-photo feature for a photo-essay titled "Floods Aftermath", with the headline, "The flood leaves its victims on the bread line". The essay continued across two additional pages of photos showing flood victims. In that same issue, 15 photos by Bourke-White appeared in a separate story about the Supreme Court of the United States.

== Reception ==
Readers of Life magazine reacted positively to Bourke-White's coverage of the Louisville flood. Photographer Louis Clyde Stoumen, then a college student at Lehigh University, wrote a letter to the editor praising At the Time of the Louisville Flood, calling Bourke-White "truly great" and applauding the magazine for its "editorial courage" in publishing the photo. Another letter to the editor came from Walter White of the National Association for the Advancement of Colored People, who congratulated the magazine on its "fair pictorial representation" of Black Americans in its story about the flood victims. American studies scholar John Raeburn later described At the Time of the Louisville Flood as one of the "strongest" photos of Bourke-White's career. Photography professor Mark Durden called the photo "brilliant and succinct", arguing that it represents Bourke-White's departure from the world of commercial photography toward a documentary style rooted in what he describes as the "truth and honesty" of human experience.

== Analysis ==
=== National Association of Manufacturers ===
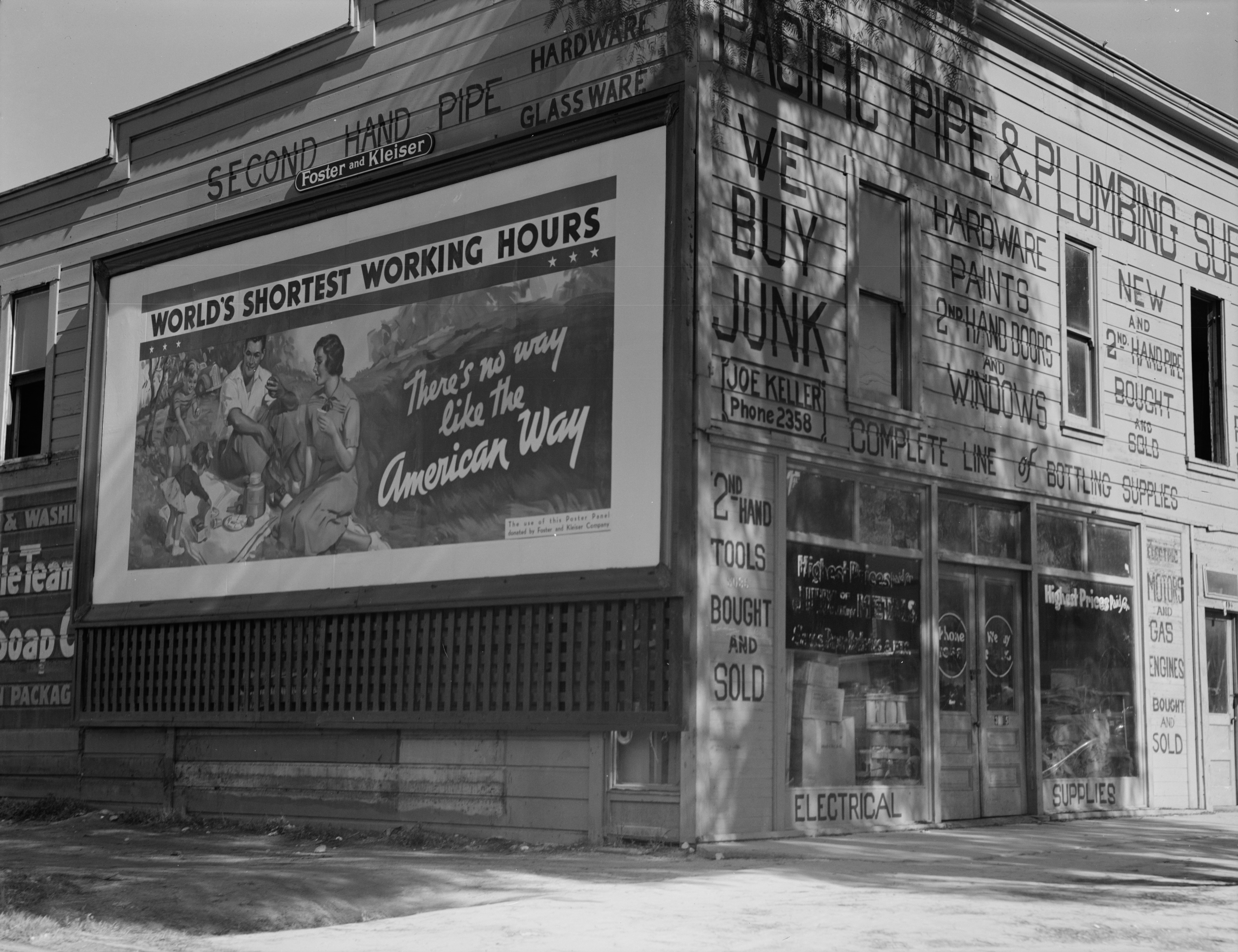
World's Shortest Working Hours (Dorothea Lange, March 1937), U.S. Highway 99, California.

The billboard featured in the photo originated in a campaign by the National Association of Manufacturers (NAM), a pro-business trade association founded in 1895. NAM took a market fundamentalism position while representing the interests of American companies. They opposed unions, federal taxes, and government regulations, including restrictions on child labor (Note: The New Deal helped bring an end to most child labor in the United States with the passage of the Fair Labor Standards Act of 1938.) in the early 20th century.

Beginning in 1935, NAM came out in opposition to the New Deal, with The Business Week announcing that NAM had declared "war" (Note: The Business Week: "...news went out to the world that America's foremost industrial organization had declared war on the present Administration, and not by whispering behind the door, but by shouting its challenge so that both the attacked and the friends of the attacker may plainly hear....Among those who have materially contributed to this rejuvenation they mention...National Steel Co....Colgate-Palmolive-Peet Co....Baldwin Locomotive...E. I. duPont de Nemours & Co....American Rolling Mill Co....[and] General Foods Co.") on the administration of President Franklin D. Roosevelt. They began their campaign the next year, (Note: See: "Business Prepares to Tell Its Story"." The Literary Digest. August 22, 1936. 122 (8): 29.) taking out newspaper advertisements arguing against the program. The group was supported in their opposition by the U.S. Chamber of Commerce, the American Liberty League, and a number of media outlets. Their campaign coincided with the 1936 United States presidential election, which Roosevelt won in a landslide victory, despite NAM's efforts.

After the election, NAM took a step back with a conciliatory tone, expressing their intent to work with the new administration, but at the same time, they expanded their public relations budget from $36,500 ($846,853 in 2025) to $793,043 ($18.4 million in 2025)—an almost 22-fold increase. By 1938, it was estimated that NAM had used this money to fund the placement of 60,000 billboards and the creation of news dispatches, radio programs, a film, and educational materials intended for libraries. In the original article featuring Bourke-White's photo, Life magazine referred to NAM's billboard as part of a "propaganda campaign". Roosevelt's Farm Security Administration (FSA) documented the billboards around the country, with photos taken by Edwin Locke, Dorothea Lange, Russell Lee, Arthur Rothstein, and John Vachon. Even though Bourke-White was not part of FSA, American Studies scholar James Guimond described her photo as "the most famous picture of the NAM billboards".

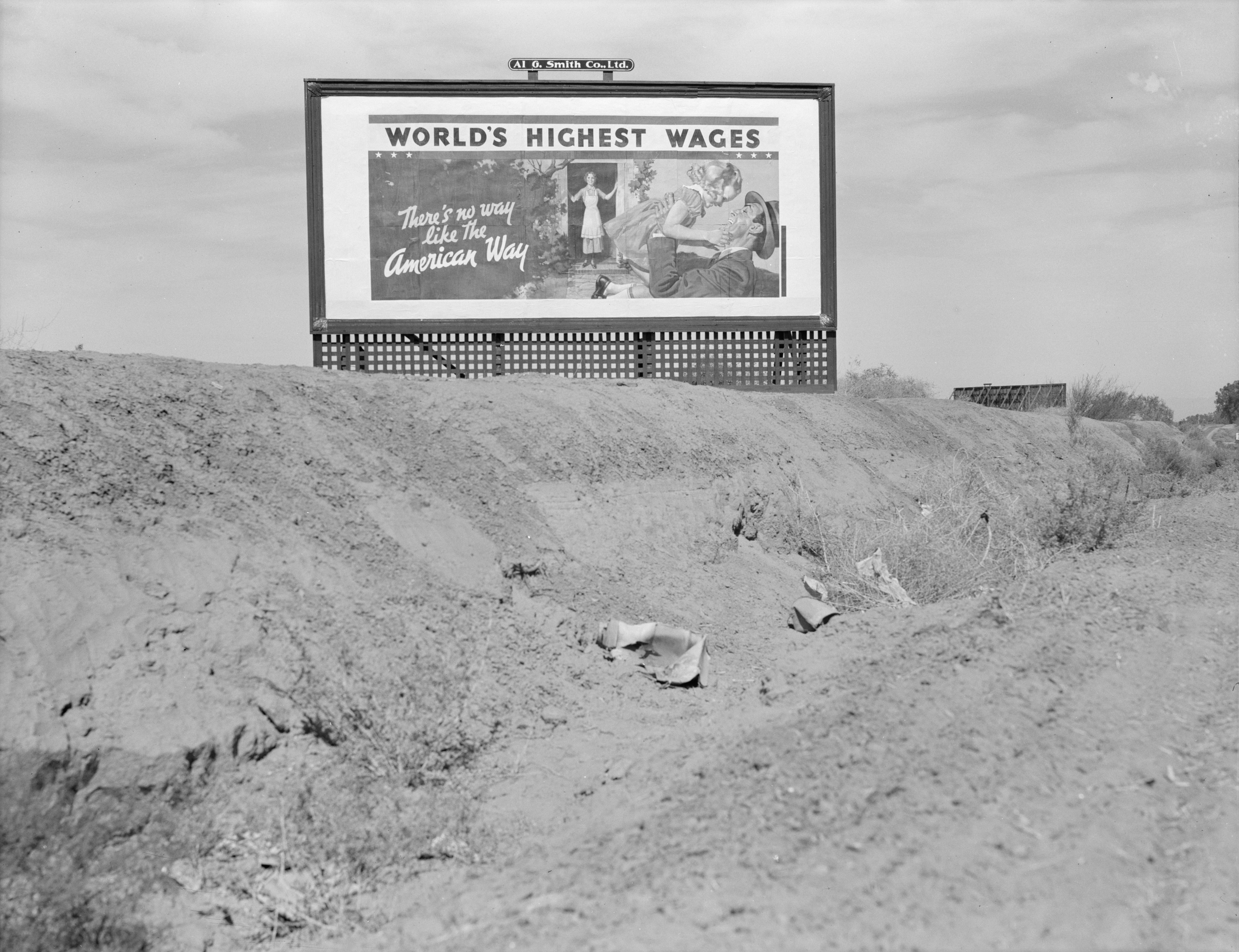
World's Highest Wages (Dorothea Lange, March 1937), U.S. Highway 99, California.

=== Framing and composition ===
Design theorist Clive Dilnot argues that the framing and composition of the photo are simple yet deliberate in their contrasts of "black/white, rich/poor, reality/illusion". There are multiple levels of interpretation here, writes Dilnot. For one, there is the very real, documentary aspect of the photo, the reality of the event itself. On the other hand, there is the contrast between what the poster on the NAM billboard is communicating to the viewer and the contradiction represented by the breadline. According to Dilnot, this contrast alters the viewer's reference point from the flood and its relief efforts to the economic concerns of the Great Depression and the divisions between blacks and whites and between "wealth and poverty" that it reveals. The photo serves to remind the viewer, writes Dilnot, that the racial divide is also an economic one.

Philosopher Barbara E. Savedoff explores the same ideas as Dilnot noting that "Bourke-White exposes the gap between propaganda and reality, between black and white, between those who enjoy the 'world's highest standard of living,' and the vulnerability of those suffering in need." Savedoff also emphasizes the documentary nature of the image; Bourke-White captured this scene as the line of people passed in front of the billboard. (Note: Savedoff's point is brought home when one examines four images in the series (At the Time of the Louisville Flood, Fresh Water Line, Flood Victims, Louisville, Untitled (Fresh Water Line, Flood Victims, Louisville), and Louisville Flood Red Cross Relief Station, Louisville, K. Y.) showing the larger context of the relief line and how it passes by the billboard and out of the frame in both directions, going both down the street to the left and into the building housing the relief station to its right. This was later demonstrated on a digital tablet at the LIFE Magazine and the Power of Photography (2020) exhibition for visitors.) It is real, as it was neither constructed nor artificial. She wonders if the image will have the same impact in the future, as the rise of computer-based tools alters the assumptions and expectations of the audience. Savedoff poses the question: "[As] we become accustomed to seamless assemblages and montages, might we become less able to appreciate the profundity, the powerful testimony, of the straight image?"

=== Breadline ===
Literary critic Donald Pizer explores the history of the breadline depicted in At the Time of the Louisville Flood. The photo was first published by Life in an article with the title "The flood leaves its victims on the bread line". Pizer notes that the image of the breadline in America has a longer history, first arising after the Panic of 1893 towards the end of the Gilded Age, but acquiring an association with the Great Depression many decades later. Americans waiting in breadlines at Depression-era soup kitchens became one of the defining images of the 1930s.

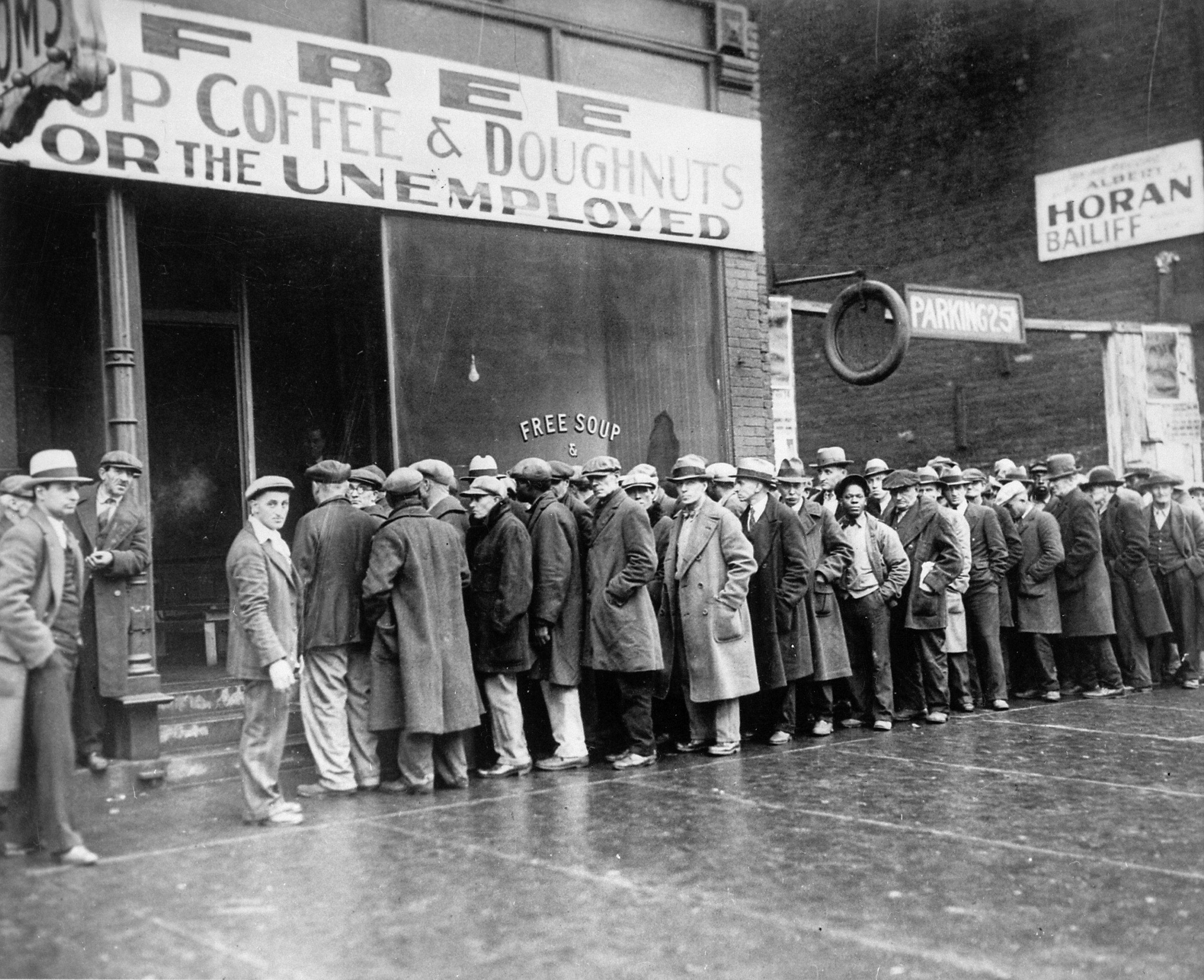
Unemployed men queued outside a depression soup kitchen opened in Chicago by Al Capone, 1931 (unknown)

The image appeared everywhere in the media at the time, but usually anonymously, with no photo credit attached. Some photographers like Edward Steichen (Breadline on Sixth Avenue, c. 1930) and Dorothea Lange (White Angel Bread Line, 1933) received credit and became known for their breadline photos. Pizer argues that Bourke-White's depiction of the breadline follows in the longer tradition of its use as an "American icon of poverty", but differs from its original meaning in the 1890s, when it was largely seen as a form of class conflict. Here, Pizer writes, Bourke-White's breadline becomes a symbol of "social disparity" in terms of "racial dimensions".

=== Recontextualization ===
Art historian Theodore M. Brown describes how the photo of At the Time of the Louisville Flood was recontextualized over time. (Note: There are many examples of the image being used outside its original context of the flood. Brown notes that "its meaning was even stretched" by Reich propaganda minister Joseph Goebbels, who made use of Bourke-White's photograph in Nazi propaganda, publishing it with the caption, "Thank God, we have a better way" [a rejoinder to the NAM slogan, "There's no way like the American Way" on the billboard]. Fifty-five years after the photo was originally published, the authors of the 1992 book, The Annotated Mona Lisa: A Crash Course in Art History from Prehistoric to Post-Modern describe it as showing the "unemployed on a breadline during the Depression". In 2008, during the subprime mortgage crisis phase of the Great Recession, the Australian Broadcasting Corporation published an opinion piece by economist Jon Stanford using the photo to lead the article with the title, "A Great Depression crisis".) Brown acknowledges that the photo depicts members of a lower income Black neighborhood in Louisville that was hit hard by the floods, but also points out that it does not show "unemployment or welfare, or the kind of chronic poverty" that was documented by the government during the Great Depression or by Bourke-White in the Southern United States. In spite of these differences, the photo instead, writes Brown, is "used repeatedly to comment on inequality, poverty and deprivation". Brown refers to the image as "probably her most famous individual photograph".

Art historian John A. Walker explored Brown's idea of recontextualization, arguing that the photo took on additional interpretations and meaning once it was removed from the original context of the Life magazine article about the flood. "Since the photograph itself makes no reference to a flood or to Louisville", writes Walker, "only those featured in the photograph, or who helped to produce it, or who read the article in Life would be aware of its specific spatio-temporal point of origin."

== Series ==
There are more than 20 known photos in Bourke-White's Louisville Flood series. Of the entire series, only eight photos were originally published by Life in 1937, with approximately 15 or more left unpublished. Additional photos taken by Corwin Short of Bourke-White in the field during her original assignment for Life were first exhibited in 1987 and donated to the University of Louisville in 2002.

=== Red Cross relief station sub-series ===
At the Time of the Louisville Flood is part of a sub-series within the larger Louisville flood series consisting of at least four known photos of the same scene from different angles and perspectives. This sub-series includes At the Time of the Louisville Flood, Fresh Water Line, Flood Victims, Louisville, Untitled (Fresh Water Line, Flood Victims, Louisville), and Louisville Flood Red Cross Relief Station, Louisville, K. Y. At the Time of the Louisville Flood is the only published image in the sub-series.

Two of the unpublished photos in the series reveal the line of people receding towards the back into the distance down the street, while the other two do not, constraining the frame to show either 18 (At the Time of the Louisville Flood) or 21 people waiting in line (Louisville Flood Red Cross Relief Station, Louisville, K. Y.). Bourke-White's reframing of the shot in the other two images (Fresh Water Line, Flood Victims, Louisville I and II) shows the line of people becoming much longer in both directions, expanding towards the right foreground of the frame where it disappears inside a building that houses the relief center, and also into the far distance to the left in the background, showing that the line of people disappears around and down the corner of the street, visibly emerging after some distance as the winding line of people appears in the frame once again off to the side in the background. Curator Brian Piper of the New Orleans Museum of Art notes that unlike the original published version, more information is provided about the famous scene with this additional image, as, according to Piper, the "camera's vantage in this version [Fresh Water Line, Flood Victims, Louisville] gives a sense of perspective and lets us know just how long the queue of displaced people extended down the street."

A fourth photo in the sub-series, Louisville Flood Red Cross Relief Station, Louisville, K. Y., is taken towards the line of people from the side instead of away from it, and from a lower angle.

The following is a list of known published and unpublished works in the series. The unpublished list remains incomplete. A dagger (^{†}) indicates a photo is part of the Red Cross relief station sub-series. Grayed out text indicates an unknown photo in the series that is assumed to exist. Titles are either based on editorial captions or given to the images by curators as noted. If no caption or curatorial title exists, a brief description appears in its place.

Published

1. Baby in Shelter During Flood, Louisville, Kentucky (Life, February 8) Johnson Museum printICP print
2. At the Time of the Louisville Flood (Life, February 15)^{†}
3. Untitled (Staffs of the Louisville Courier-Journal and Times) (Life, February 15) ICP print
4. Untitled (Tom Wallace) (Life, February 15)
5. Untitled (Wilbur Cogshall) (Life, February 15) ICP print
6. Untitled (St. Paul's Episcopal Church) (Life, February 15)
7. Untitled (Jim Lawhorn) (Life, February 15)
8. Untitled (Women and Babies at Churchill Downs) (Life, February 15) ICP print

Unpublished

1. Untitled (Fresh Water Line, Flood Victims, Louisville) (Note: The New Orleans Museum of Art acquired an alternate take from the series in 1979 and gave it the title Fresh Water Line, Flood Victims, Louisville.) (Unpub.)^{†}
2. Fresh Water Line, Flood Victims, Louisville (Unpub.)^{†}
3. Untitled (Louisville Flood Red Cross Relief Station) (Note: Sotheby's auctioned a print of this photo from the Ginny Williams Collection in 2020 with the title Louisville Flood Red Cross Relief Station, Louisville, K. Y.) (Unpub.)^{†}
4. Untitled (No Food Will Be Served Unless You Have A Food Check) (Unpub.)
5. Untitled (Twenty Grand Cigarettes) (Unpub.)
6. Untitled (Louisville, Kentucky, at the time of the Great Ohio River Flood) (Unpub.)
7. Untitled (Clara Stull) (Unpub.) ICP print
8. Untitled (Ohio River Flood) (Unpub.)
9. Untitled (Churchill Downs) (Unpub.)ICP print
10. Untitled (Homeless in Louisville) (Unpub.)
11. Untitled (The Great Ohio River Flood) (Unpub.)
12. Untitled (Unknown) (Unpub.)
13. Untitled (Flood Victim in a Makeshift Boat) (Unpub.)
14. Untitled (Men in a Boat) (Unpub.)
15. Untitled (Reflection of Man in Boat in Window) (Unpub.)

== Selected exhibitions ==
The photo was exhibited by the Museum of Modern Art a little over a month after it was first published by Life magazine. It appeared at the Photography 1839–1937 exhibition from March 17 to April 18, 1937, where it was shown as The Flood Leaves Its Victims on the Bread Line, the original title of the photo-essay. In the exhibition, the image appeared alongside four other photos by Bourke-White, (Note: Archival photos of the 1937 MoMA exhibition featuring Bourke-White's photos on the gallery floor are available to view.) including Chrysler Factory, Iron Puddler, U.S.S.R., Construction on Wind Tunnel, Fort Peck, Montana, and Woman Who Wept for Joy, Textile Factory, U.S.S.R.

One of the earliest uses of the title At the Time of the Louisville Flood was in the Photography in the Twentieth Century exhibition at the National Gallery of Canada in 1967. The new title gained currency (Note: It is not clear why one title was used over another, but there are some hints. The FSA photography collection contains contemporaneous images that documented the NAM billboard campaign, some of which already used the title World's Highest Standard of Living to describe their images.) in subsequent exhibitions at the Baltimore Museum of Art (1969) and the Museum of Modern Art (1971).

The exhibition LIFE Magazine and the Power of Photography (2020), organized by the Princeton University Art Museum and the Museum of Fine Arts, Boston, displayed the photograph in an installation named "Frame after Frame". It was presented along with digital negatives from the series on a tablet to show how Bourke-White prepared for the photograph by "capturing images from different vantage points".

- Photography 1839–1937 (1937, Museum of Modern Art, New York)
- Photography in the Twentieth Century (1967, National Gallery of Canada)
- Photography in the Twentieth Century (1969, Baltimore Museum of Art)
- The Artist as Adversary (1971, Museum of Modern Art, New York)
- Margaret Bourke-White: Photojournalist (1972, Andrew Dickson White Museum of Art, New York)
- Bourke-White: A Retrospective (1988, International Center of Photography, New York)
- Margaret Bourke-White In Print: An Exhibition (2006, Archibald S. Alexander Library, Rutgers University, New Jersey)
- LIFE Magazine and the Power of Photography (2020, Princeton University Art Museum)
- The New Woman Behind the Camera (2021, The Metropolitan Museum of Art, New York; National Gallery of Art, Washington)
- LIFE Magazine and the Power of Photography (2022, Museum of Fine Arts, Boston)
- Work and Society in the 1930s: American Paintings and Photographs from the Shogren-Meyer Collection (2023, Cedar Rapids Museum of Art, Iowa)

== Sources ==
=== Books ===
- Bourke-White, Margaret (1963). Portrait of Myself. Simon and Schuster. OCLC 630874.
- Durden, Mark (2021). "Connections and Conflicts: Margaret Bourke-White's Corporate, Commercial, and Documentary Photography". In Jovanovich, Monica E.; Renn, Melissa (eds.). Corporate Patronage of Art & Architecture in the United States, Late 19th Century to the Present. Bloomsbury Visual Arts. ISBN 9781501377877. OCLC 1242819183.
- Goldberg, Vicki (1986). Margaret Bourke-White: A Biography. Harper & Row. ISBN 9780060155131. OCLC 12941857.
- Guimond, James (1991). American Photography and the American Dream. University of North Carolina Press. ISBN 9780807819463. OCLC 22422452.
- Herbert, Stephen (2004). A History of Early Television. Vol. 1 (1st ed.). Routledge. ISBN 9780415326667. OCLC 834871209.
- McEuen, Melissa A. (2000). "Of Machines and People: Margaret Bourke-White's Isolation of Primary Components". Seeing America: Women Photographers between the Wars. The University Press of Kentucky. ISBN 9780813158419. OCLC 903959729.
- Nadel, Nancy (1992). "From Leica to Life". Peter Stackpole: Life in Hollywood, 1936–1952. Book by Peter Stackpole. Clark City Press. ISBN 9780944439180. OCLC 612442120.
- Oreskes, Naomi; Conway, Erik M. (2023). The Big Myth: How American Business Taught Us to Loathe Government and Love the Free Market. Bloomsbury Publishing. ISBN 9781635573572. OCLC 1369492221.
- Raeburn, John (2006). A Staggering Revolution: A Cultural History of Thirties Photography. University of Illinois Press. ISBN 9780252092190. OCLC 817813568.
- Savedoff, Barbara (2008). "Documentary Authority and the Art of Photography". In Walden, Scott (ed.). Photography and Philosophy: Essays on the Pencil of Nature. Blackwell. ISBN 9781444335088. OCLC 656563594.
- Strickland, Carol; Boswell, John (1992). The Annotated Mona Lisa: A Crash Course in Art History from Prehistoric to Post-Modern. p. 184. ISBN 9781449482138. OCLC 1022731024.
- Tagg, John (2009). "Melancholy Reasoning: Walker Evans's Resistance to Meaning". The Disciplinary Frame: Photographic Truths and the Capture of Meaning. University of Minnesota Press. ISBN 9780816666225. OCLC 318218237.
- Weber, Anne-Katrin (2022). Television before TV: New Media and Exhibition Culture in Europe and the USA, 1928–1939 (1st ed.). Routledge. doi:10.5117/9789463727815. ISBN 9781003704973. OCLC 1548020606.
- Welky, David (2011). The Thousand-Year Flood: The Ohio-Mississippi Disaster of 1937. University of Chicago Press. ISBN 9780226887166. OCLC 711050931.
- Whisenhunt, William Benton; Saul, Norman E. (2016). New Perspectives on Russian-American Relations. Routledge. ISBN 978-1-13891-623-4. OCLC 918941221. "This was the first time a professional photographer from abroad had been allowed to take pictures of the "Piatiletl" (Five-year plan)."
- Wolf, Sylvia (1994). Focus: Five Women Photographers: Julia Margaret Cameron, Margaret Bourke-White, Flor Garduño, Sandy Skoglund, Lorna Simpson. A. Whitman. pp. 16–27. ISBN 9780807525319. OCLC 1416271209.

=== Journals and magazines ===
- Cosgrove, Ben (March 24, 2014). "Behind the Picture: 'The American Way' and the Flood of '37". Time.
- Dilnot, Clive (2010). "Being prescient concerning Obama, or Notes on the politics of configuration (part one)". The Poster: A Critical Journal of Design. 1 (1): 7–29. doi:10.1386/post.1.1.7_1.
- Dilnot, Clive (2011). "Notes on the politics of configuration (Part II): A Berlin event". The Poster: A Critical Journal of Design. 2 (2): 171–208. doi:10.1386/post.2.2.171_1.
- "Faces in the Flood". Life. Vol. 2, no. 6. February 8, 1937. ISSN 0024-3019.
- "Floods Aftermath". Life. Vol. 2, no. 7. February 15, 1937. ISSN 0024-3019.
- "LIFE on the American Newsfront". Life. Vol. 2, no. 5. February 1, 1937. ISSN 0024-3019.
- McDonald, Robert L. (1994). "The Moment of "Three Women Eating": Completing the Story of You Have Seen Their Faces". The Courier. 310 (XXIX). Syracuse University Library Associates: 61–74.
- "The N.A.M Declares War". The Business Week. December 14, 1935.
- Pizer, Donald (2007). "The Bread Line: An American Icon of Hard Times". Studies in American Naturalism. 2 (2). University of Nebraska Press.Full access available to users of The Wikipedia Library.
- "The President Asks for Power to Increase the Size of the Supreme Court". Life. Vol. 2, no. 7. February 15, 1937. ISSN 0024-3019.
- Stoumen, Louis (March 1, 1937). "Letters to the Editor: Social Comment". Life. Vol. 2, no. 9. ISSN 0024-3019.
- Taylor, Alan (August 28, 2019). "The Photography of Margaret Bourke-White". The Atlantic.
- Walker, John A. (May 1978). "Reflections on a photograph by Margaret Bourke-White" (PDF). Creative Camera (167). ISSN 0011-0876.
- White, Walter (March 29, 1937). "Letters to the Editor: N.A.A.C.P Appreciation". Life. Vol. 2, no. 13. ISSN 0024-3019.

=== Newspaper articles ===
- Bertucci, Leo (April 26, 2025). "Retro Louisville: 'World's Highest Standard of Living' mural showcased amid 1937 floods in Louisville". Courier Journal.
- "The Cedar Rapids Museum of Art announces a new exhibition: Work and Society in the 1930s". Iowa News Now. KGAN. May 25, 2023.
- Feeney, Mark (October 9, 2022). "At the MFA, a new show looks at what LIFE left out". The Boston Globe. pp. N1, N6.
- Giffin, Connor (March 22, 2023). "How we got here: Louisville's high-water history and the aging levee system standing guard". Courier Journal.
- "Photo Exhibit". The Baltimore Sun. September 14, 1969.
- Reilly, Elizabeth E. (March 5, 2012). "'37 Flood Exhibit Draws Big Crowds". University of Louisville Libraries News.
- Stanford, Jon (March 16, 2008). "A Great Depression crisis". Australian Broadcasting Corporation.

=== Art and exhibition catalogs ===
- Bussard, Katherine A.; Gresh, Kristen, eds. (2020). LIFE Magazine and the Power of Photography. Princeton University Art Museum and the Museum of Fine Arts, Boston. ISBN 9780943012278. OCLC 1184015296.
- Brown, Theodore M. (1972). Margaret Bourke-White: Photojournalist. Andrew Dickson White Museum of Art. Cornell University. OCLC 394056.
- Callahan, Sean (1972). The Photographs of Margaret Bourke-White. New York Graphic Society. ISBN 9780821206560. OCLC 2366234.
- Carner, Bill (February 2012). "Louisville's 1937 Flood: A 75th Anniversary Exhibition" (PDF). The Owl. University of Louisville Libraries.
- Corwin, Sharon (2010). "Constructed Documentary: Margaret Bourke-White from the Steel Mill to the South". In Corwin, Sharon; May, Jessica; Weissman, Terri (eds.). American Modern: Documentary Photography by Abbott, Evans, and Bourke-White. University of California Press. ISBN 9780520265622. OCLC 606760541.
- Goldberg, Vicki (1988). Bourke-White: A Retrospective. United Technologies Corporation. OCLC 20522212.
- Hostetler, Lisa (1999). "Biographies". In Handy, Ellen; Sullivan, Constance (eds.). Reflections in a Glass Eye: Works from the International Center of Photography Collection. International Center of Photography. Little, Brown and Company. ISBN 9780821226254. OCLC 44651499.
- Jones, Jones (1971). The Artist as Adversary. The Museum of Modern Art. p. 56. ISBN 9780870702266. OCLC 1022851289.
- Lyons, Nathan (1967). Photography in the Twentieth Century. Horizon Press. George Eastman House of Photography. OCLC 3560672.
- Nelson, Andrea (2020). The New Woman Behind the Camera. National Gallery of Art. ISBN 9781942884743. OCLC 1159551159.
- Newhall, Beaumont (1937). Photography 1839–1937. The Museum of Modern Art. OCLC 1033232.
- Piper, Brian (April 17, 2020). "Object Lesson: Fresh Water Line, Flood Victims, Louisville by Margaret Bourke-White". New Orleans Museum of Art.
- Saretzky, Gary D. (2006). Margaret Bourke-White in Print: An Exhibition (PDF). Rutgers University Libraries Special Collections and University Archives. OCLC 68910881.
- "Section 1: Getting the Picture—Frame after Frame (installation documentation and didactics)". LIFE Magazine and the Power of Photography (PDF). Princeton University Art Museum. Museum of Fine Arts, Boston.
- Sexton, Robby (May 7, 2014). "World's Highest Standard of Living". Art Institute of Chicago. Collection Spotlight.

=== Photographs ===
- Bourke-White, Margaret (1937). "Fresh Water Line, Flood Victims, Louisville". Accession: 79.33. New Orleans Museum of Art.
- Bourke-White, Margaret (1965) [1937]. "Baby in shelter during flood, Louisville, Kentucky". Accession: 65.568. Herbert F. Johnson Museum of Art, Cornell University. Archived from the original on May 31, 2025.
- Bourke-White, Margaret (2005) [1937]. "Lonely little African-American baby sucking her thumb next to a blanketed cage of canaries in shelter at school during severe flooding". The LIFE Magazine Collection. Accession No. 1650.2005. International Center of Photography.
- Bourke-White, Margaret (2005) [1937]. "City room of the Louisville Courier Journal at the time of the Louisville Flood: (L-R) Art Abfies (photographer-feet on desk), B. Platt (reporter-"Press" on hat), Harold Davis (photographer, Lighting cigarette at lamp). Wilbur Cogshall (news editor)". The LIFE Magazine Collection. Accession No. 1646.2005. International Center of Photography.
- Bourke-White, Margaret (2005) [1937]. "Editor Wilbur Cogshall of the Louisville Courier-Journal at his desk drinking boiled water from bottle while reporting on severe flooding". The LIFE Magazine Collection. Accession No. 1649.2005. International Center of Photography.
- Bourke-White, Margaret (2005) [1937]. "African American refugees left homeless after severe flooding sleep in temporary relief station set up in clubhouse of Churchill Downs racetrack, Louisville". The LIFE Magazine Collection. Accession No. 1647.2005. International Center of Photography.
- Bourke-White, Margaret (2005) [1937]. "Gloomy view of the race track at Churchill Downs submerged in water from the surging Ohio River". The LIFE Magazine Collection. Accession No. 1645.2005. International Center of Photography.
- Bourke-White, Margaret (2005f) [1937]. "Nurse Clara Stull prepares typhoid inoculation for flood victims at refugee aid station at Hikes Grade School, Louisville". The LIFE Magazine Collection. Accession No. 1648.2005. International Center of Photography.
- Bourke-White, Margaret (December 4, 2020). "Louisville Flood Red Cross Relief Station, Louisville, K. Y.". Photographs from the Ginny Williams Collection. Sotheby's.

=== Websites ===
- Havern, Christopher (July 29, 2022). "The Long Blue Line: Ohio River, 1937—Coast Guard's largest flood response 85 years ago!". United States Coast Guard. Archived from the original on August 16, 2022.
- "The Louisville Flood of '37". Time. 2020. Archived from the original on September 30, 2020.
- "Photographic Archives commemorates 1937 Ohio River flood". University of Louisville. January 20, 2012.
- Short, Corwin (1937). "105 black and white snapshots of '37 flood taken by Corwin Short (Sr.), include shots of Margaret Bourke-White". Archives & Special Collections. University of Louisville.
