= Eugenia Parry Janis =

American art historian (born 1940)

- Born: July 28, 1940 (age 86); Chicago, Illinois, U.S.
- Occupation: Art historian
- Awards: Guggenheim Fellowship (1973)

Academic background
- Education: University of Michigan (BA); Harvard University (MA and PhD)
- Thesis: The monotypes of Edgar Degas (1971)

Academic work
- Discipline: Art history
- Sub-discipline: History of photography
- Institutions: Wellesley College; University of New Mexico

Eugenia Parry Janis (born July 28, 1940) is an American art historian. A 1973 Guggenheim Fellow, she originally studied painting before switching to photography after learning several lesser-known Parisian painters went into photography due to financial issues, and she has written several books, exhibition catalogues, and essays. She also worked at Wellesley College and the University of New Mexico teaching art and photography.

== Biography ==
Eugenia Parry Janis was born on July 28, 1940, in Chicago to Greek-American parents and raised on the South Side. According to an anecdote she shared with Southwest Contemporary, she once had the same kindergarten teacher with future first lady Michelle Obama. After spending two summers attending the School of the Art Institute of Chicago in 1959 and 1960, she attended the University of Michigan where she got a BA in 1961 and Harvard University where she got an MA in 1963 and a PhD in 1971. Her doctoral dissertation was The monotypes of Edgar Degas.

In 1968, Janis joined Wellesley College as an art instructor. She was later promoted to assistant professor in 1970, and by 1980 had received a promotion to associate professor. She later started teaching photography history at the University of New Mexico after being invited there as a replacement for Beaumont Newhall. She was a visiting lecturer at Harvard (1971–1972) and Brandeis University (1973). She also served in the George Eastman Museum Visiting Committee.

Janis specializes in French photography, contemporary photography, and efforts to elevate photography as an important part of art history. She originally studied the work of painters, with her 1968 book Degas: A Critical Study of His Monotypes (Note: Reviews of this book:) being focused on the work of French painter Edgar Degas, but later became interested in photography history after learning several lesser-known Parisian painters went into photography due to financial issues. She has authored more than a hundred works, including books, articles, and exhibition catalogues. In 2000, she published Crime Album Stories: Paris 1886-1902, a short story collection inspired by Alphonse Bertillon's police photographs of violent crime; Rizzo called it one of "Parry's largest projects".

Janis self-identified "as more of an explorer" than a photographer. Nazareth professor Ron Netsky noted that she has a unique approach to photographs than other photography historian, with Janis saying that she's "interested in the way photographs escape their documentary character and enter into a realm that is much more mysterious and affects us at a much deeper spiritual level." She once remarked that photographs like the one John Filo took of the Kent State shootings "have a power to symbolize rather than describe". When asked about her creative process: "No, I have no routine. I am a procrastinator; I am the worst example of a writer. I do a lot of research.

In 1973, Janis was awarded a Guggenheim Fellowship to study the history of French photography. She was a 1980 American Council of Learned Societies Fellow. By 1991, she became the first George Eastman House Visiting Scholars Fellow.

Janis spoke at the 2018 Review Santa Fe's closing dinner.

Janis lives in Los Cerrillos, New Mexico, having moved to the state in 1986.

== Works ==
- Degas: A Critical Study of His Monotypes (1968)
- (exhibition catalogue) Exhibition of Nineteenth Century Photography at Jewett Arts Center (1969)
- (exhibition catalogue) The Second Empire, 1852-1870: Art in France Under Napoleon III (1978)
- (ed. with Wendy Snyder MacNeil) Photography Within the Humanities (1977)
- The Second Empire, 1852-1870: Art in France Under Napoleon III (1978)
- (as essayist, with Belinda Rathbone) One of a Kind: Recent Polaroid Color Photography (1979)
- (as essayist) The Painterly Print: Monotypes from the Seventeenth to the Twentieth Century (1980)
- (with André Jammes) The Art of French Calotype (1983) (Note: Reviews of this book:)
- The Photography of Gustave Le Gray (1987)
- (as essayist) Nuclear Enchantment (1991, by Patrick Nagatani)
