= One of a Kind: Recent Polaroid Color Photography =

1979 exhibition catalogue

- Author: Belinda Rathbone (curator and preface); Eugenia Parry Janis (introductory essay)
- Language: English
- Genre: Photography
- Publisher: Godine
- Publication date: 1979
- ISBN: 0879232897
- OCLC: 5529248

One of a Kind: Recent Polaroid Color Photography is the exhibition catalogue of the 1978–1979 art exhibition of the same name. Published by Godine in 1979, it has a preface written by its curator Belinda Rathbone and an introductory essay by Eugenia Parry Janis. It features dozens of Polaroid photographs from over a few dozen artists, including Ansel Adams, Linda Connor, William Eggleston, David Hockney, Arnold Newman, and Willard Van Dyke. The book received praise for its diversity and representation of photographers, as well as a positive-to-mixed reception on the Polaroid concept and Janis' essay.

== Contents ==
One of a Kind was curated by Belinda Rathbone. It starts with a preface written by Rathbone and features an introductory essay by Eugenia Parry Janis, who explains that the theme behind the featured works is "private realities". Rosenblum said that the essay's "lush prose accords with the Sybaritic vision she discerns in these color photographs". The catalogue has 77 pages and 72 color plates.

Throughout One of a Kind, items depicted in photographs include human body parts, food, personal objects, and rooms. Rosenblum characterizes the photographs as "inanimate representations of the detritus of contemporary middle-class society", comparing them to advertisements on billboards and magazines. Leavitt said that the book uses subject matter and color permutations as a major theme due to Polacolor's ability to emphasize color contrasts. Artists who have their own sections in One of a Kind are Ansel Adams, Jack Caspary, Linda Connor, Marie Cosindas, Frank DiPerna, William Eggleston, Benno Friedman, John Gintoff, Brian Hagiwara, David Haxton, David Hockney, Les Krims, William Larson, Roger Mertin, Arnold Newman, Starr Ockenga, Olivia Parker, Bruce Patterson, Rosamond Wolff Purcell, John Reuter, Don Rodan, Lucas Samaras, Victor Schrager, Sharon Smith, Eve Sonneman, Joel Sternfeld, Willard Van Dyke, and Peter Von Zur Muehlen.

Photography styles depicted in One of a Kind include still lifes, collages, and landspaces. Formats based on Polacolor and the Polaroid SX-70 are represented in the catalogue. Although there were several 20-by-24-inch color prints at the exhibition, they are not included in the catalogue since they would not have fit in the book without sacrificing authentic quality.

== Background ==
One of a Kind: Recent Polaroid Color Photography was a traveling exhibition centered on Polaroid photographs. Funded by Polaroid Corporation (the brand's manufacturer), it featured 72 works created by 32 photographers, which varied in size; many were in smaller formats such as the Polaroid SX-70, while others were in larger ones.

The exhibition started in June 1978 at the Franklin Institute in Philadelphia, under the name One of a Kind Color: Color of One Kind. Franklin Institute curator of museum collections Harvey Miller said that the museum was "a very appropriate choice" for the exhibition despite having different scopes given photography's technological nature, and Julia Lawlor of the Philadelphia Daily News called it a sign that "'snap-shot' photography has finally been accepted as a form of expression by professional photographers." The exhibition's later made its final stop was at Art Institute Chicago, where it was held from April 19 to June 15, 1980. David Elliott of the Chicago Sun-Times praised the exhibit as a "bright and gamesome show", suggesting that the idea of this was that "Polaroid photos can be art, and many kinds of art. Not always top-notch, of course, but undeniably artistic."

The exhibition catalogue was published by Godine in 1979.

== Reception ==
Don Leavitt of Popular Photography praised One of a Kind's unique concept of "explor[ing] the unique sensibility of the Polaroid color palette", saying that "as one browses through the lushly printed pages of this oversize publication, one can readily sense that the esthetic boundaries of instant color photography have now become a distinct tradition". Vicki Goldberg of American Photographer said that the book "points up one of the neatest conversions in color photography, the switch to mendacity", and also that it was "by no means the last word", explaining "the ability [of the Polaroid format] to elicit a great performance is rare indeed", but admitted that "for all its gloss and stridency, its earnestness, high jazz and calculated vulgarity, One of a Kind ends up oddly uninspired" due to the then-nascent nature of the medium.

Naomi Rosenblum compared the images shown in One of a Kind to the daguerreotype era on the basis of how Polaroid photographers confronted the shared challenge of "creating visual statements of significance from this latest application of optics and chemistry", concluding that the book "suggests that, as in the past, many are called but few are chosen". Goldberg praised the diversity of the photos' styles throughout the book and remarked that "try to outwit the medium by making it difficult", and Lawrenceville School librarian Marilyn Lutz commended the book for its representation of "a broad spectrum of aesthetic concerns" and of both the experienced and novice generations of photographers," However, Sally Eauclaire of Art in America called most of the book's images "so gratuitous or gimmicky that they can't even be shored up by the extravagant interpretations that enthusiasts such as Janis (to a far greater extent than Kozloff) provide", believing that their visibility was made possible only by Polaroid Corporation's intervention.

Eauclaire compared One of a Kind to SX-70 Art (1979)—another catalogue for a traveling Polaroid exhibition—remarking that Janis and one of the essay writers of that book, Max Kozloff, "get caught up in the sociological and psychological issues that always surround discussion of Polaroid products." Goldberg called the introduction "thoughtful, if somewhat overwrought and overwritten", and Lutz said the introduction "enhances this addition to serious collections." However, Eauclaire criticized Janis for not addressing the private motives behind Polaroid photos, and characterized Janis' argument that such notions are "as wonderful as the first trials of Talbot and Niépce" as "enthusiastic" and "to say the least, infatuated".

In 1979, the book was recommended as a Christmas present by Phil Thomas of Associated Press. In 2018, Alicia Chester of Afterimage compared Janis' description of the Polaroid "as a rich union of tint and chiaroscuro that begins to deny the object, while establishing a tension in the color photograph between record and invention" to Instagram photographs.
