= Cosson (surname) =

Cosson or de Cosson is a surname. Notable people with the surname include:

- Antoine Alexandre de Cosson (1766–1839), French general of the Revolution and Empire, baron of the Empire
- Charles Alexander de Cosson (1846–1929), British scholar and collector of arms and armour
- Elizabeth Cosson (born 1958), Australian army officer and public servant
- Ernest Cosson (1819–1889), French botanist
- Euretta de Cosson Rathbone (died 2003), British skier
- George Cosson (1876–1963), American politician from Iowa
- Steve Cosson (born 1968), American theatre writer and director
- Victor Cosson (1915–2009), French road cyclist
