= NBC photomural =

1933 photomural by Margaret Bourke-White

The NBC photomural (1933) (Note: "NBC photomural" is the most accepted name for this work in the literature. Many other names for the piece have appeared, but their origin is unknown and have no provenance. It is assumed that these alternate names for the photomural arose out of titles editors gave to various articles about the work that was published in newspapers and magazines.) was a monumental work by photographer Margaret Bourke-White created for NBC in the RCA building at Rockefeller Center in New York City. The photomural measured just under 11 feet high and 164 feet wide (about 3 by 49 meters) and was installed in the Art Deco Mezzanine Rotunda one level above the entrance lobby. It was considered one of the largest photomurals in the world at the time. It featured 22 black-and-white photographs of components used for transmitting and receiving radio, including one depicting the then-new technology of television. Photomurals were a new medium, having first been introduced in 1927. Bourke-White completed it in only two weeks, at age 29.

The mural was interpreted as a tribute to both American progress and capitalism. It is also considered an example of corporate propaganda. The development process was beset with problems. Drix Duryea, a commercial artist who had lost the original commission to Bourke-White, attempted to take credit for the project and started a whisper campaign against her. Bourke-White eventually prevailed in the dispute. The incident led her never to speak of the project again, omitting it entirely from her autobiography. The mural was removed in the early 1950s and likely destroyed. When the Mezzanine Rotunda space was modernized in the 2010s, curved LED video walls were added which now replicate the original photomural digitally on a rotating basis.

== Background ==
Midtown Manhattan grew considerably between 1920 and 1935, with many photographers commissioned to document the new developments in the city. Bourke-White became enamored with the construction of the Chrysler Building after working on a project for Walter Chrysler in 1929. When she discovered that there were gargoyles being built, she decided that she had to move there. According to New York law, only a janitor could legally reside in an office, so she applied for the job, but the position was taken. Arrangements were made for her to have a photography studio in the building. Because of legal discrimination against women, Bourke-White was not allowed to sign a lease, so her employer at Time had to cosign. She began working from the Chrysler Building after returning from a four-month assignment in Germany and the Soviet Union in late 1930.

Her studio, which was designed by her friend John Vassos, was on the 61st-floor, adjacent to not one, but two metal eagle gargoyles. (Note: See Chrysler Building (1929–30) and Chrysler Building, c. 1930, among several others in the larger Chrysler Building series held by Syracuse University. Oscar Graubner, Bourke-White's assistant who printed her film, took two additional photos of her working atop the 61st floor eagle gargoyle from different angles, one of which was published in Life in January 1934 (Margaret Bourke-White atop the Chrysler Building). One image shows Bourke-White from the side; another shows her from above.) With her deep-abiding interest in herpetology, she installed a fish tank, kept turtles, and took care of two pet alligators in a pond on the terrace. When she moved into her studio penthouse, the Chrysler was the tallest building, and by dint of her location, also the highest photo studio in the world for a short while. By 1934, she could no longer afford her lease, and she was evicted from the building. She also owed several hundred dollars to Eastman Kodak. In spite of these issues, her reputation as a photographer continued to bring in new clients. Still, there were a minority of dissenters, potential clients who opposed what they perceived as her abstract approach, believing that it distracted from the representation of their product.

One of the earliest known photomurals was created in Chicago by commercial photographers Kaufmann & Fabry in 1927. It was produced from a 4 × 5-inch negative of the Taj Mahal. Their client, socialite Bobsy Goodspeed, hired the studio to decorate a wall in her living room with the image. The technology of photography continued to advance into the 1930s, with Kodak producing specialized bromide enlarging papers allowing for the enlargement of photographs used to decorate not just walls, but entire rooms. The New York Times announced the arrival of the "photo-mural", as it was then called, for interior design in January 1931. The new medium was promoted by designers and artists alike, including Le Corbusier and André Breton. The photomural was embraced by architects, finding its way into modern architecture of the 1930s.

== Commission ==
As the construction of Rockefeller Center continued in the 1930s, plans were drawn up to commission artists to decorate each of the buildings in the complex. Various ideas were proposed with "The March of Civilization" one of the more dominant of several themes emerging by 1932. Bourke-White received a commission in 1933 to cover the history of radio in a photomural in the rotunda (Note: Contrary to popular accounts, Bourke-White's mural did not replace Man at the Crossroads by Diego Rivera, which was intended to be installed in the lobby, not the Mezzanine Rotunda. Rockefeller commissioned Josep Maria Sert to replace Rivera's mural with American Progress, the main work featured in the lobby at 30 Rockefeller Plaza today. Many sources still confuse the lobby of the RCA building with the rotunda in their description of the locations of the two works. The two spaces are entirely different, although they are both connected by the Grand Stair. Robert Linsley compared the two works in the Oxford Art Journal in 1994. Linsley wrote: "But more directly in dialogue with Rivera's work is the gigantic photo mural of radio transmission equipment by Margaret Bourke-White that formerly hung in the lobby of the NBC offices in the RCA building." The lobby, where Rivera's work was to be installed, was on the lower level of the RCA building. Bourke-White's work was installed in the rotunda, on the upper level. Historian Emily Thompson also refers to the area of the photomural as the lobby in her book The Soundscape of Modernity (2004). The confusion may arise from its function, as both spaces can be described as lobbies. For example, the main lobby of the RCA building on the street level and the mezzanine lobby for NBC studios.) of the NBC studio mezzanine of the RCA building. She was paid a fee of $3,500 ($87,050 in 2025) for her work. The commission was very much needed, writes archivist Gary Saretzky, as the Great Depression was in full swing, and many of Bourke-White's clients could no longer pay her; Fortune magazine, her employer, had also cut her fee. All of this led to Bourke-White going into debt.

== Development ==
Bourke-White captured 22 black-and-white photographs depicting the transmission and reception of radio. Many of the indoor photos were taken early in the morning, from one to seven a.m., at a time when broadcasting facilities were empty. The entire development and installation process was performed at a quick pace in just two weeks.

To complete the production process of the mural, Bourke-White was forced to work with Drix Duryea, a commercial photographer who had access to the technology necessary to produce photos printed in a large format. This was problematic, as Duryea had lost the original art commission to Bourke-White. He made the project difficult for her, even attempting to steal it from her and use his own photos in place of hers and sign his name to her project.

It is also believed that Duryea spread unfounded rumors to the press about Bourke-White to attack her, with sexist and disparaging tales invented about her personal life and relationships, as well as allegations that she relied on men to pay her rent and was addicted to drugs. Duryea was forced to remove his photos and his name from her mural, with Bourke-White's photos restored to their original location. NBC's "Radio City" opened for the first time on November 11, 1933. Bourke-White's mural was complete by December. The NBC photomural was Bourke-White's first attempt in that large-scale medium. She later proclaimed it "a new American art form".

== Description ==
The exhibition area was accessed from the Main Lobby of the RCA building via a 16 foot wide marble staircase known as the Grand Stair, flanked by four large columns. The mural decorated the NBC studio Mezzanine Rotunda, which was used as a reception hall to accommodate hundreds of thousands of visitors per year and was the starting point for guided tours. The mural was split into two parts, a south and a north wall, each containing 11 black-and-white photographs, for a total of 22 images.

The south wall contained 11 images showing the technology used for the transmission of radio waves, while the north wall contained 11 images depicting its reception. The large, zoomed-in subjects in an area of 10.67 × 164 feet (3.2 × 49 m) lend the series a sense of abstraction. Both walls feature central panels. On the south wall, the central panel is the broadcast microphone, while on the north wall, the central panel is a receiving tube of the kind found inside radios.

Bourke-White photographed several of the objects NBC used to broadcast their radio programs from Bellmore, Long Island. This was the location of the RCA-50B transmitter for WEAF (1922–1946), the flagship station for the NBC Radio Network, the first national radio network in the United States. Two images from this location are on the south wall: the transmission station helix (a 50,000 watt radio frequency coupling transformer), and the large antenna tower on the end.

South wall

1. Antenna tower
2. Rectifiers
3. Generator
4. Transmission tubes
5. Busbars
6. Microphones (one velocity and two carbon)
7. Busbars
8. Winding condenser coils
9. Transmission station helix
10. Loudspeakers
11. Antenna tower

North wall

1. Antenna tower
2. Insulators (Note: Title description is based on records of past auctions of prints of the same image by Artnet. It may not be the title or description used by Bourke-White. She did not use titles or descriptions of her work; they were usually added by editors or curators, and contained minimal descriptions of basic facts.)
3. Electric generators
4. Large coil
5. Panel boards
6. Receiving tubes
7. Panel boards
8. Knife switches
9. 10-kilowatt power transmission tubes
10. Cathode ray tube
11. Antenna tower

Bourke-White's placement of the cathode ray tube image on the north wall of the photomural pointed directly to the future of NBC television studios. When the building was dedicated in late 1933, four studios on the ninth floor had already been set aside for television broadcasting, with a pre-broadcasting television studio tour beginning in 1938. The official launch for NBC television broadcasting occurred the next year at the 1939 New York World's Fair.

== Exhibitions ==
The NBC photomural was exhibited at the RCA building from 1933 to the early 1950s. NBC studio tours began in 1933, with the rotunda exhibition space used as the starting place for the tour. The area was also filled with museum-like glass display cases containing artifacts of technology. Aural historian Emily Thompson describes this display as "fetishized modern electroacoustical inventions", presented "as if they were precious holy relics".

Saretzky notes that the fate of the original mural remains unknown. Photo historian Vicki Goldberg believes the mural was taken down in either 1953 or 1954 and likely destroyed. Related prints from the set used for the photomural have been exhibited elsewhere. Prints from the series can be found in the collections of the Metropolitan Museum of Art, the Museum of Fine Arts, Houston, the San Francisco Museum of Modern Art, and the National Gallery of Australia. Other images in Bourke-White's series related to radio are found in her WOR transmitter set that she later took in 1935.

== Legacy ==
The 1933 incident with Duryea presumably so upset Bourke-White that she never spoke of the photomural again nor made any mention of it in her autobiography. When it was completed, it was one of the largest photomurals in the world, but it was surpassed by others soon after. The next year, Kaufmann & Fabry and photographer George Ebling created a photomural for the Ford Motor Company pavilion at the 1934 Chicago World's Fair measuring more than 600 feet (183 meters) in length.

After her death, a recreation of the photomural was exhibited in 1988 at a Bourke-White retrospective held at the International Center of Photography. It was later restored to its original location in digital form in 2014 when the Grand Stair and Mezzanine Rotunda at 30 Rockefeller Center was redeveloped and modernized. Two 5 × 60 feet (1.52 × 18.29 m) curved LED video walls were installed, which now replicate Burke-White's original NBC photomural on a rotating basis along with other images.

== See also ==
- Machine aesthetic
