= Impressionists in Winter =

Impressionists in Winter: Effets de Neige was a late 20th-century art exhibition featuring 63 Impressionist winter landscape paintings by artists Claude Monet, Pierre-Auguste Renoir, Camille Pissarro, Alfred Sisley, Gustave Caillebotte, and Paul Gauguin.

Influenced by the work of art historian Charles Moffett and curated by Eliza Rathbone, Impressionists in Winter was sponsored by J.P. Morgan & Co. and opened in 1998 at The Phillips Collection art museum in Washington, D.C. In 1999, the exhibition appeared at the Yerba Buena Center for the Arts in San Francisco and the Brooklyn Museum in New York City.
