= Eliza Rathbone =

American art historian and museum curator

- Born: Eliza E. Rathbone; 1948 (age 77–78); St. Louis, Missouri, U.S.
- Education: New York University (BA); Courtauld Institute of Art (MA)
- Occupations: Art historian, museum curator
- Known for: Chief Curator of The Phillips Collection (1985–2015)
- Parent: Perry T. Rathbone (father)
- Relatives: Belinda Rathbone (sister)

Eliza E. Rathbone (born 1948) is an American art historian and museum curator. She was chief curator of The Phillips Collection in Washington, D.C., from 1985 until her retirement in 2015. Her work focused on European and American modern art, and she organized exhibitions and catalogues on artists including Pierre-Auguste Renoir and Vincent van Gogh. She holds the title of Chief Curator Emerita.

== Early life and education ==
Rathbone was born in 1948 in St. Louis, Missouri. Her father was Perry T. Rathbone (1911–2000), director of the Saint Louis Art Museum and later of the Museum of Fine Arts, Boston, and afterward a senior executive at the auction house Christie's. Her mother was Euretta ("Rettles") de Cosson Rathbone. Her elder brother, Peter Rathbone, became head of the American paintings department at Sotheby's, and her younger sister, the writer and photography historian Belinda Rathbone, is the author of The Boston Raphael, an account of the disputed acquisition that preceded their father's departure from the Museum of Fine Arts in 1972.

Rathbone attended Miss Porter's School in Farmington, Connecticut, and completed her undergraduate degree in art history at New York University. She earned a master's degree from the Courtauld Institute of Art at the University of London.

== Career ==
=== National Gallery of Art ===
Rathbone spent eight years as an assistant curator of twentieth-century art at the National Gallery of Art in Washington, D.C., where she collaborated on major exhibitions under the curators E. A. Carmean and Jack Cowart. During this period she independently organized Modigliani: An Anniversary Exhibition and Mark Tobey: City Paintings, writing the catalogue for the latter.

=== The Phillips Collection ===
In 1985 Rathbone joined the Phillips Collection as associate curator, working under director Laughlin Phillips and curator Willem de Looper. She became the museum's chief curator, a post she held until her retirement in 2015. The Phillips holds a collection of Impressionist, Post-Impressionist and modern art assembled by its founder, Duncan Phillips.

In 1996 Rathbone organized Impressionists on the Seine: A Celebration of Renoir's Luncheon of the Boating Party, a study of Impressionist painting along the Seine centered on the museum's Renoir, Luncheon of the Boating Party. She later returned to the painting in the exhibition and catalogue Renoir and Friends: Luncheon of the Boating Party (2017–2018). Other exhibitions of French painting included Impressionists in Winter: Effets de Neige (1998), co-organized with Charles S. Moffett, and Impressionist Still Life (2001), co-organized with George T. M. Shackelford.

Van Gogh Repetitions (2013–2014) was organized jointly with the Cleveland Museum of Art. Based on a comparison between the Phillips's The Road Menders and Cleveland's The Large Plane Trees, the exhibition examined van Gogh's practice of making multiple versions, or "repetitions," of his compositions, drawing on technical analysis of his paintings in several collections.

=== Later work ===
After leaving the Phillips, Rathbone was guest curator of Avery, Gottlieb & Rothko: By the Sea, an exhibition on the work of Milton Avery, Adolph Gottlieb and Mark Rothko. It opened at the Cape Ann Museum in Gloucester, Massachusetts, in 2026 and is scheduled to travel to the Phillips Collection, with a catalogue published by Rizzoli Electa.

== Selected exhibitions ==
- Modigliani: An Anniversary Exhibition, National Gallery of Art
- Mark Tobey: City Paintings, National Gallery of Art
- Nicolas de Staël in America, The Phillips Collection (1990)
- Impressionists on the Seine: A Celebration of Renoir's Luncheon of the Boating Party, The Phillips Collection (1996)
- Impressionists in Winter: Effets de Neige, The Phillips Collection (1998)
- Impressionist Still Life, The Phillips Collection (2001)
- Van Gogh Repetitions, The Phillips Collection and the Cleveland Museum of Art (2013–2014)
- Renoir and Friends: Luncheon of the Boating Party, The Phillips Collection (2017–2018)
- Avery, Gottlieb & Rothko: By the Sea, Cape Ann Museum and The Phillips Collection (2026–2027)

== Selected publications ==
- Mark Tobey: City Paintings. National Gallery of Art (1984).
- Nicolas de Staël in America. The Phillips Collection (1990).
- Impressionists on the Seine: A Celebration of Renoir's Luncheon of the Boating Party (with Richard R. Brettell, Charles S. Moffett and Katherine Rothkopf). ISBN 978-1887178211.
- Impressionists in Winter: Effets de Neige (with Charles S. Moffett, Katherine Rothkopf and Joel Isaacson). ISBN 978-0856674952.
- Impressionist Still Life (with George T. M. Shackelford). ISBN 978-0943044279.
- Art Beyond Isms: Masterworks from El Greco to Picasso in the Phillips Collection (2002).
- Master Paintings from the Phillips Collection (with Susan Behrends Frank and Robert Hughes). ISBN 978-1904832928.
- Van Gogh Repetitions (with Elizabeth Steele, William H. Robinson and Marcia Steele).
- Renoir and Friends: Luncheon of the Boating Party (with Mary Morton, Sylvie Patry, Aileen Ribeiro, Elizabeth Steele and Sara Tas). ISBN 978-1911282006.
