= Caufield & Shook =

American photography company

- Company type: Commercial photography
- Founded: 1903; 123 years ago
- Founder: James Caufield and Frank W. Shook
- Defunct: 1978
- Headquarters: Louisville, Kentucky

James Caufield and Frank W. Shook were American photographers who founded an eponymous photography studio in Louisville, Kentucky in 1903. Their firm focused on local Louisville scenes. It became the official photographer of the Kentucky Derby in 1924. The business was sold in 1960 and ceased operation in 1978.

A catalog of the firm's works titled the Caufield & Shook Collection, consisting of more than one million negatives and 2,000 vintage prints, is housed at the University of Louisville Photographic Archives.
