= Belinda Rathbone =

American writer (born 1950)

- Born: October 30, 1950 (age 75); St. Louis, Missouri, U.S.
- Occupations: Biographer; art historian
- Spouse: John Ouchterlony (m. 1992, separated)
- Children: 1
- Parents: Perry T. Rathbone (father); Euretta de Cosson Rathbone (mother)

Academic background
- Education: Simon's Rock at Bard College; Goddard College

Academic work
- Discipline: Art history; biography
- Institutions: Boston Public Library; Museum of Modern Art

Belinda Rathbone (born October 30, 1950) is an American art historian and biographer. After working briefly as a photographer, she later worked as a curator specializing in the art, with her work including One of a Kind: Recent Polaroid Color Photography (1979) and American Dreams (1987). Since then, she has written several biographies and non-fiction books, including Walker Evans: A Biography (1995), The Guynd: A Scottish Journal (2005), and The Boston Raphael (2014).

== Biography ==
Belinda Rathbone was born on October 30, 1950, in St. Louis, Missouri, to museum director Perry T. Rathbone and British alpine skier and arts patron Euretta de Cosson Rathbone. She was later raised in Cambridge, Massachusetts. She obtained an AA from Simon's Rock at Bard College in 1970, and after spending a year at the School of the Museum of Fine Arts, obtained an MA from Goddard College in 1975.

During her early years, Rathbone had a brief career as an artistic photographer. She competed in the Boston Center for the Arts' Photovision '72 contest in May 1972, becoming one of the winners. Her rural architecture photographs appeared at the Photographs by (29) New England Women exhibition at Harvard-Loeb Drama Center in November 1972. She was part of the BCA's Photovision '75 exhibition; Robert Taylor of The Boston Globe remarked that her work's form had "wit". She also held solo exhibitions at the Panopticon Gallery in Boston in July 1974 and the Ahimsa Gallery in Milbridge, Maine, in July 1976.

Rathbone worked as a curatorial assistant in the Boston Public Library Department of Prints from 1976 to 1977, an artists' liaison at Polaroid Corporation's publicity department from 1977 to 1979, and as a curatorial intern at the Museum of Modern Art Department of Photography from 1979 to 1980. She was curator for the 1987 exhibition catalogue American Dreams, featuring photographs shown at the Museo Nacional Centro de Arte Reina Sofía. She worked as the curator of the photographs in the Edward R. Downe, Jr. Collection from 1988 until 1992.

As a historian, Rathbone specializes in photography and the arts. In 2005, she published The Guynd: A Scottish Journal, centered on her husband's Regency era estate in Angus, Scotland. She wrote The Boston Raphael, a 2014 book about a career-ending scandal her father was involved in over a painting inaccurately attributed to Raphael, as well as George Rickey: A Life in Balance, a 2021 biography on the titular sculptor. She served as the editor for her father's journals, published as On In the Company of Art: A Museum Director's Private Journals in April 2024. She also co-authored Two Lives: Alfred Stieglitz and Georgia O'Keeffe (1992), Walker Evans: The Lost Work (2000), and Tea with Miss Rose: Recipes & Reminiscences of Boston's Teacup Society (2002).

Rathbone married Scottish engineer John Ouchterlony, 26th Laird of The Guynd, on January 6, 1992. The couple had one child before they separated. Rathbone is a Democrat. She is an Episcopalian. As of 1995, she lived in Cambridge.

== Works ==
- One of a Kind: Recent Polaroid Color Photography (1979)
- American Dreams (1987)
- (with Elizabeth Turner and Roger Shattuck) Two Lives: Alfred Stieglitz and Georgia O'Keeffe (1992)
- Walker Evans: A Biography (1995) (Note: Reviews of this book:)
- (with Clark Worswick) Walker Evans: The Lost Work (2000)
- (co-authored) Tea with Miss Rose: Recipes & Reminiscences of Boston's Teacup Society (2002)
- The Guynd: A Scottish Journal (2005) (Note: Reviews of this book:)
- The Boston Raphael: A Mysterious Painting, an Embattled Museum in an Era of Change & a Daughter's Search for the Truth (2014) (Note: Reviews of this book:)
- George Rickey: A Life in Balance (2021)
- (ed.) In the Company of Art: A Museum Director's Private Journals (2024, by Perry T. Rathbone)
