= Margaret Bourke-White =

American photographer (1904–1971)

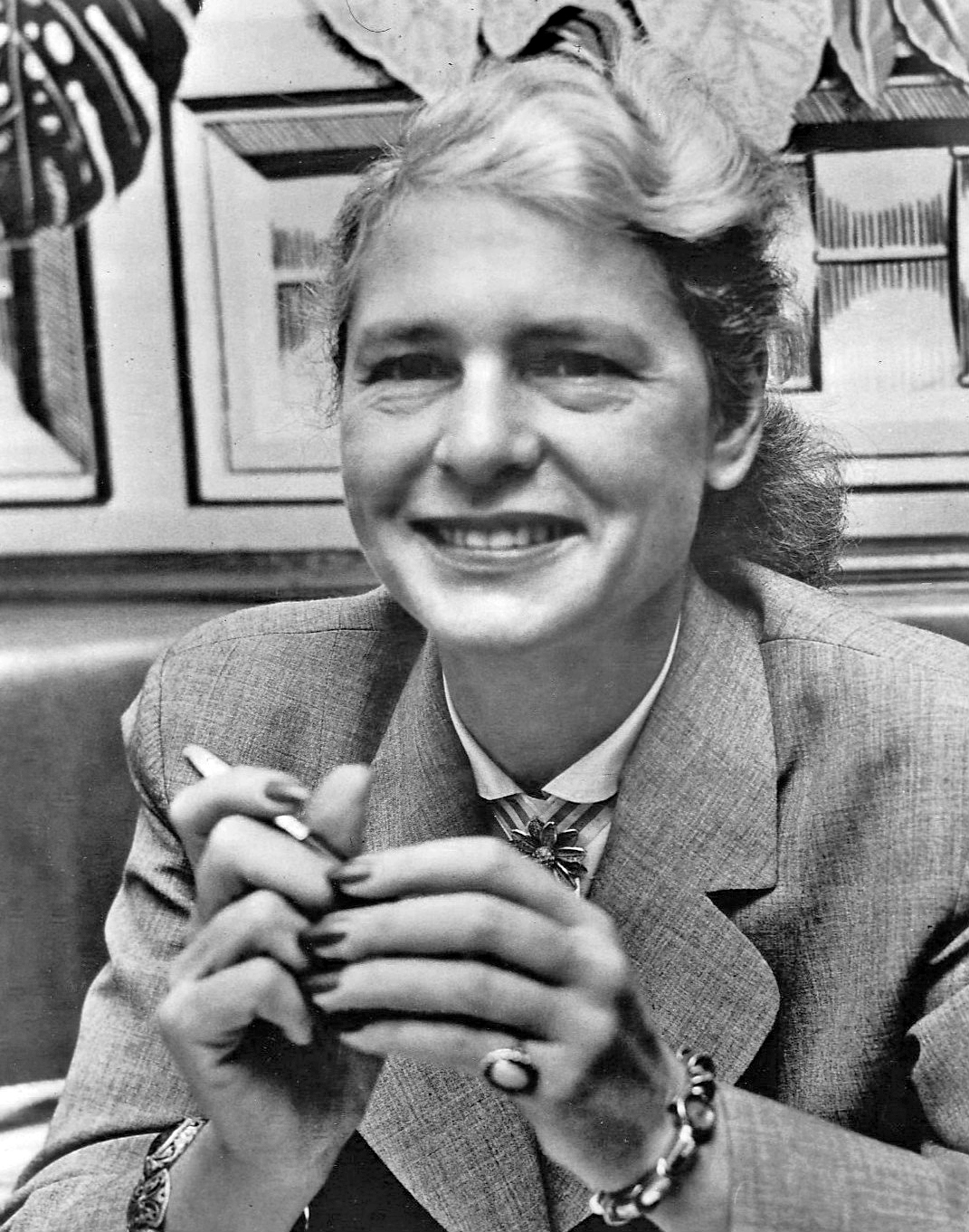
- Bourke-White in 1955
- Born: Margaret White; June 14, 1904; New York City, U.S.
- Died: August 27, 1971 (aged 67); Stamford, Connecticut, U.S.
- Other name: Peggy
- Education: Columbia University; University of Michigan; Purdue University; Western Reserve University; Cornell University
- Occupations: Photographer, photojournalist
- Spouses: Everett Chapman (m. 1924; div. 1926) Erskine Caldwell (m. 1939; div. 1942)

Margaret Bourke-White (/ˈbɜːrk/; June 14, 1904 – August 27, 1971) was an American documentary photographer and photojournalist. She was known as an architectural and commercial photographer for the first half of her career, representing corporate clients and highlighting the success of industrial capitalism with black and white images of steel factories and skyscrapers. In 1930, she became the first foreign photographer granted official access to document industrial sites in the Soviet Union during the first five-year plan. In 1933, she was commissioned to create the NBC photomural, a monumental photomural about radio for its rotunda at 30 Rockefeller Plaza, then considered the largest photomural in the world. The success of her corporate commissions led her to work at Fortune magazine in the 1930s. She took the photograph of the construction of Fort Peck Dam that became the cover of the first issue of Life magazine.

The second half of her career represents her transition from corporate photography to photojournalism, beginning with her work during the Great Depression documenting the people of the Dust Bowl. Her collaboration with novelist Erskine Caldwell in You Have Seen Their Faces (1937) resulted in seventy-five photos depicting the lives of poor, rural sharecroppers, and was both a commercial success and one of several major documentary works at the time to bring attention to the needs of the Southern United States. She was the first American female war photojournalist with the United States Army Air Forces, photographed the Nazi occupation of Czechoslovakia, and was with Patton's Third Army in the spring of 1945 when she famously documented the liberation of the Buchenwald concentration camp. In 1949, she was one of the first Americans to bring attention to the injustices of the South African apartheid regime with her unique photographs, and covered the Korean War for Life magazine in the early 1950s.

== Early life ==
Margaret Bourke-White, born Margaret White in the Bronx, New York, was the daughter of Joseph White, whose father came from Poland, and Minnie Bourke, who was of Irish descent. She partially grew up in the Joseph and Minnie White House in Middlesex, New Jersey, and graduated from Plainfield High School in Union County. From her naturalist father, an engineer and inventor, she claimed to have learned perfectionism; from her "resourceful homemaker" mother, she claimed to have developed “an unapologetic desire for self-improvement." Her younger brother, Roger Bourke White, became a prominent Cleveland businessman and high-tech industry founder, and her older sister, Ruth White, became well known for her work at the American Bar Association in Chicago, Ill. Roger Bourke White described their parents as freethinkers, "who were intensely interested in advancing themselves and humanity through personal achievement", attributing the success of their children in part to this quality. He was not surprised at his sister Margaret's success, saying "[she] was not unfriendly or aloof".

Margaret's interest in photography began as a hobby in her youth, supported by her father's enthusiasm for cameras. Despite her interest, in 1922, she began studying herpetology at Columbia University, only to have her interest in photography strengthened after studying under Clarence White (no relation). She left after one semester, following the death of her father.

She transferred colleges several times, attending the University of Michigan (where she was a photographer at the Michiganensian and became a member of Alpha Omicron Pi sorority), Purdue University in Indiana, and Western Reserve University in Cleveland, Ohio. Bourke-White ultimately graduated from Cornell University with a Bachelor of Arts degree in 1927, leaving behind a photographic study of the rural campus for the school's newspaper, including photographs of her famed dormitory, Risley Hall. A year later, she moved from Ithaca, New York, to Cleveland, Ohio, where she started a commercial photography studio and began concentrating on architectural and industrial photography.

== Career ==
=== Architectural and commercial photography ===
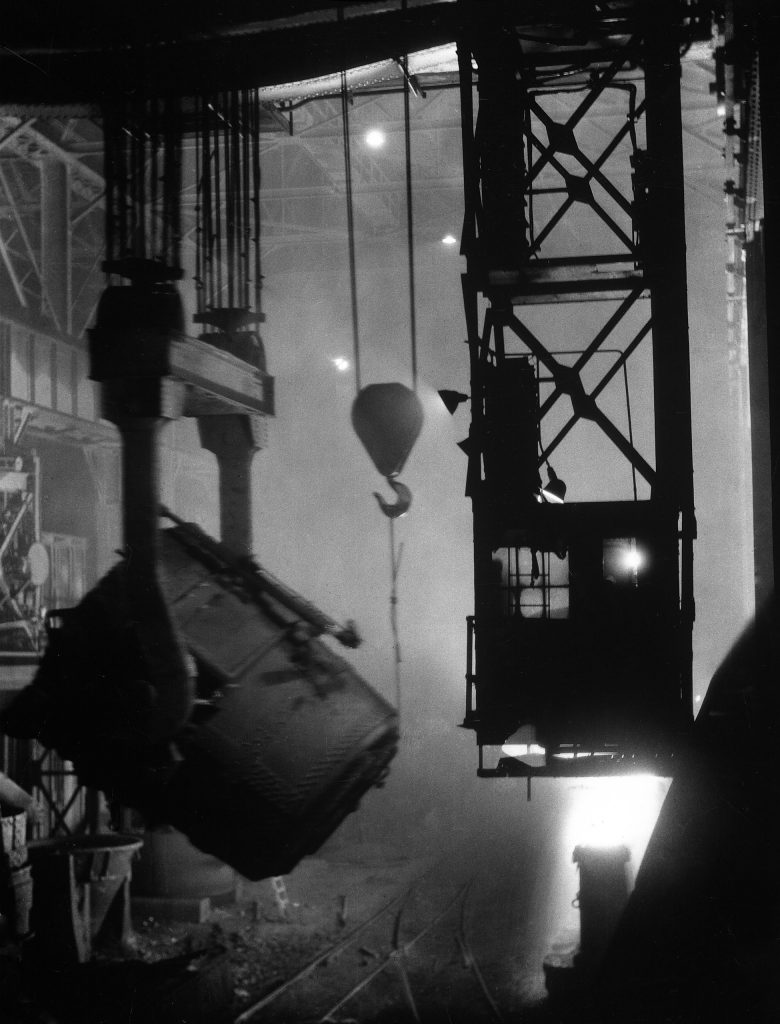
Otis Steel Mill, Ohio, 1929

One of Bourke-White's clients was Otis Steel Company. Her success was due to her skills with both people and her technique. Her experience at Otis is a good example. As she explains in Portrait of Myself, the Otis security people were reluctant to let her shoot for many reasons. Firstly, steel making was a defense industry, so they wanted to be sure national security was not endangered. Second, she was a woman, and in those days, people wondered if a woman and her delicate cameras could stand up to the intense heat, hazard, and generally dirty and gritty conditions inside a steel mill. When she finally got permission, technical problems began. Black-and-white film in that era was sensitive to blue light, not the reds and oranges of hot steel (In the words of her collaborator, the ambient red-orange light had no "actinic value"), so she could see the beauty, but the photographs were coming out all black.

My singing stopped when I saw the films. I could scarcely recognize anything on them. Nothing but a half-dollar-sized disk marking the spot where the molten metal had churned up in the ladle. The glory had withered.

I couldn't understand it. "We're woefully underexposed," said Mr. Bemis. "Very woefully underexposed. That red light from the molten metal looks as though it's illuminating the whole place. But it's all heat and no light. No actinic value."

She solved this problem by bringing along a new style of magnesium flare, which produces white light, and having assistants hold the flares to light her scenes. Her abilities resulted in some of the best steel-factory photographs of that era, which earned her national attention.

To me... industrial forms were all the more beautiful because they were never designed to be beautiful. They had a simplicity of line that came from their direct application of purpose. Industry... had evolved an unconscious beauty – often a hidden beauty that was waiting to be discovered

In 1930, Bourke-White was hired to photograph the construction of what would become one of New York City's most elegant skyscrapers, the Chrysler Building. She was deeply inspired by the new structure and especially smitten by the massive eagle's-head figures projecting off the building. In her autobiography, Portrait of Myself, Bourke-White wrote, "On the sixty-first floor, the workmen started building some curious structures which overhung 42nd Street and Lexington Avenue below. When I learned these were to be gargoyles à la Notre Dame, but made of stainless steel as more suitable for the twentieth century, I decided that here would be my new studio. There was no place in the world that I would accept as a substitute."

When the building's management initially refused to rent to a woman, Bourke-White secured a recommendation from Fortune magazine, her principal employer at the time, and opened her studio shortly thereafter. She hired John Vassos to design the deluxe interior, whose clean modern lines echoed the building's bold and graceful exterior. The Chrysler Building itself became the subject matter for Bourke-White, with the gargoyles a focal point (see).

According to photography historian Sally Stein, Bourke-White’s 1932 photograph Chrysler Corporation, showing a worker beside large industrial machinery, was reproduced in several publications during the 1930s to illustrate workers’ powerlessness.

=== Photojournalism ===
In the summer of 1929 Bourke-White accepted a job as associate editor and staff photographer for the new business-themed magazine Henry Luce was starting in the fall, Fortune magazine – a position she held until 1935.

In 1930 she became the first Western photographer allowed to enter the Soviet Union.

When Luce began his third magazine, the oversized, photograph-centered Life magazine, in 1936, he hired her as its first female photojournalist. Her photographs of the construction of the Fort Peck Dam featured in Life's first issue, dated November 23, 1936, including the cover. Though Bourke-White titled the photo, New Deal, Montana: Fort Peck Dam, "it is actually a photo of the spillway located three miles east of the dam", according to a United States Army Corps of Engineers webpage. This cover photograph became such a favorite that it was the 1930s' representative in the United States Postal Service's Celebrate the Century series of commemorative postage stamps.

She held the title of staff photographer at LIFE until 1940, but returned from 1941 to 1942, and again in 1945, after which she stayed through her semi-retirement in 1957 (which ended her photography for the magazine) and her full retirement in 1969.

In 1934, Bourke-White, like Dorothea Lange, photographed drought victims of the Dust Bowl for Fortune. She captured a famous photograph of black Louisville, Kentucky, residents displaced by the Ohio River flood of 1937 for the February 15, 1937, issue of Life magazine. Called At the Time of the Louisville Flood, the photograph shows black refugees waiting in line for disaster relief in front of a large billboard that declares, "World's Highest Standard of Living" featuring a white family driving a car. The photograph later would become the basis for the artwork of Curtis Mayfield's 1975 album, There's No Place Like America Today.

In 1948, Bourke-White attended a planning meeting in New York York organized by Nancy Newhall for a proposed exhibition of photographs by women.

=== Marriage and photojournalism in the South and Nazi Europe ===
Bourke-White met the bestselling novelist Erskine Caldwell in the mid-thirties. Caldwell specialized in writing about poor communities in the rural south, and he invited her to collaborate on a photojournalist expedition through the south, which produced the book You Have Seen Their Faces (1937).

They collaborated on two more books North of the Danube (1939) a travelogue about Czechoslovakia under the specter of Nazi occupation and Say, Is This the U.S.A. (1941) about industrialization in the United States. She lived with Caldwell for several years before they married in 1939.

They traveled to Europe to record how Germany, Austria, and Czechoslovakia were faring under Nazism.

=== Soviet Union ===
Bourke-White was "the first Western professional photographer permitted into the Soviet Union". She travelled there in consecutive summers from 1930 to 1932 to document the first Five-Year Plan. While in the USSR, she photographed Joseph Stalin, as well as making portraits of Stalin's mother and great-aunt when visiting Georgia. She also took portraits of other famous people in the Soviet Union, such as Karl Radek, Sergei Eisenstein, and Hugh Cooper. She noted that the trips and work there required a lot of patience, and she generally had mixed, yet positive impressions of the USSR. Her photographs were first published in Fortune magazine in 1931 under the title Eyes on Russia, and then as a book with the same name by Simon and Schuster. These photos additionally became "a six-part series in The New York Times (1932), a deluxe photo portfolio (1934), and a set of photomurals for the Soviet consulate in New York (1934). Still other photographs circulated in exhibitions, books, and periodicals around the globe, especially in Soviet magazines and postcards of the early 1930s."

Bourke-White returned to the Soviet Union in 1941 during the Second World War. With five cameras, 22 lenses, four developing tanks and 3,000 flashbulbs, her luggage weighed in total 600 pounds. The resulting body of work was published in a book titled Shooting the Russian War in 1942.

=== World War II ===
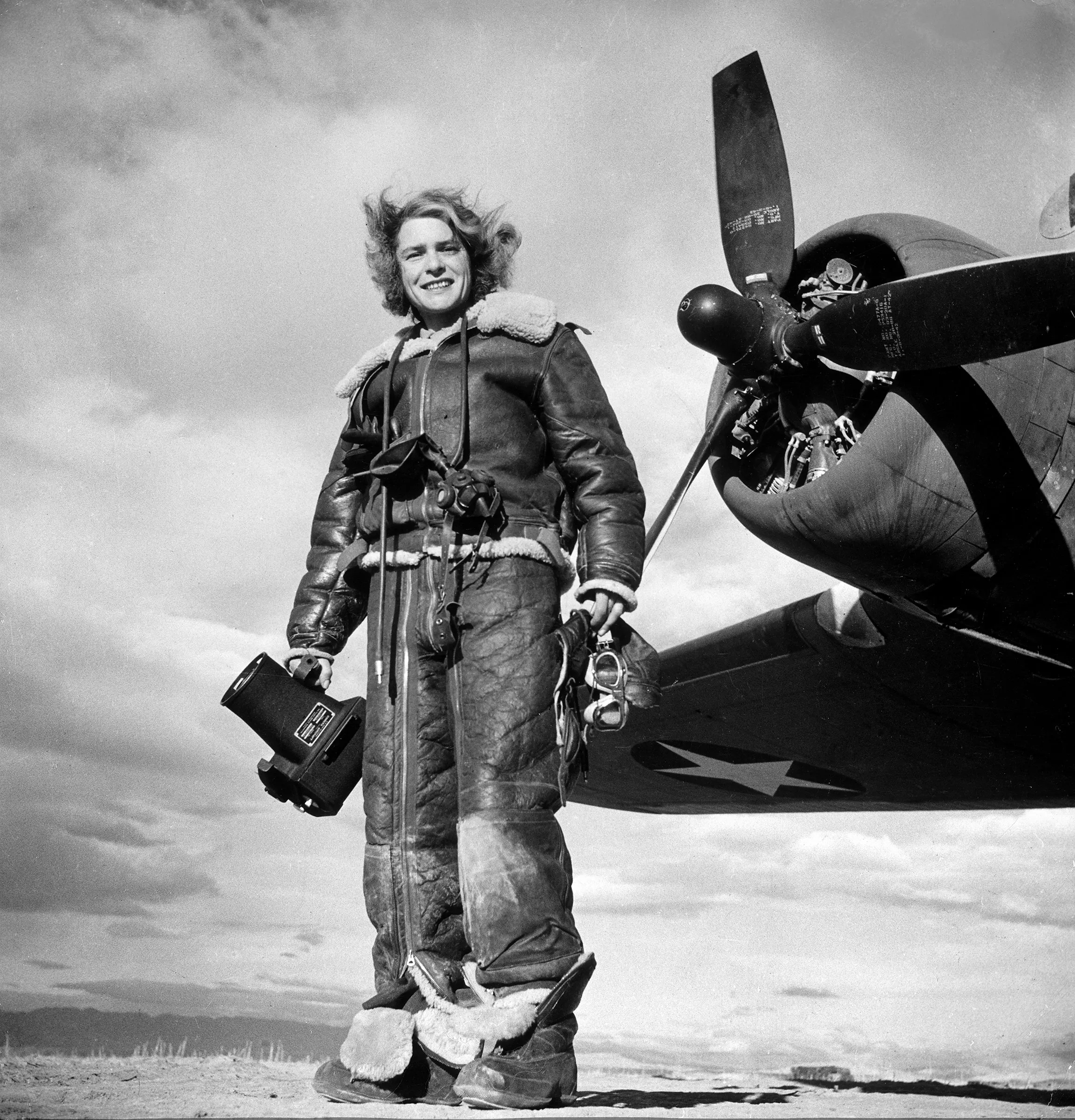
Bourke-White with the U.S. 8th Air Force

Bourke-White was the first woman to be allowed to work in combat zones during World War II. In 1941 she traveled to the Soviet Union just as Germany broke its pact of non-aggression. She was the only foreign photographer in Moscow when German forces invaded. Taking refuge in the U.S. Embassy, she then captured the ensuing firestorms on camera.

As the war progressed, she was attached to the U.S. Army Air Forces (USAAF) in North Africa, then to the U.S. Army in Italy and later in Germany. She repeatedly came under fire in Italy in areas of fierce fighting. On January 22, 1943, Major Rudolph Emil Flack piloted the lead aircraft with Margaret Bourke-White (the first female photographer/writer to fly on a combat mission) aboard his 414th Bombardment Squadron B-17F and bombed the El Aouina Airdrome in Tunis, Tunisia.

"The woman who had been torpedoed in the Mediterranean, strafed by the Luftwaffe, stranded on an Arctic island, bombarded in Moscow, and pulled out of the Chesapeake when her chopper crashed, was known to the Life staff as 'Maggie the Indestructible.'" The incident in the Mediterranean refers to the sinking of the England-Africa bound British troopship SS Strathallan that she recorded in an article, "Women in Lifeboats", in Life, February 22, 1943. Though disliked by General Dwight D Eisenhower, she became friendly with his chauffeur/secretary, Irishwoman Kay Summersby, with whom she shared the lifeboat.

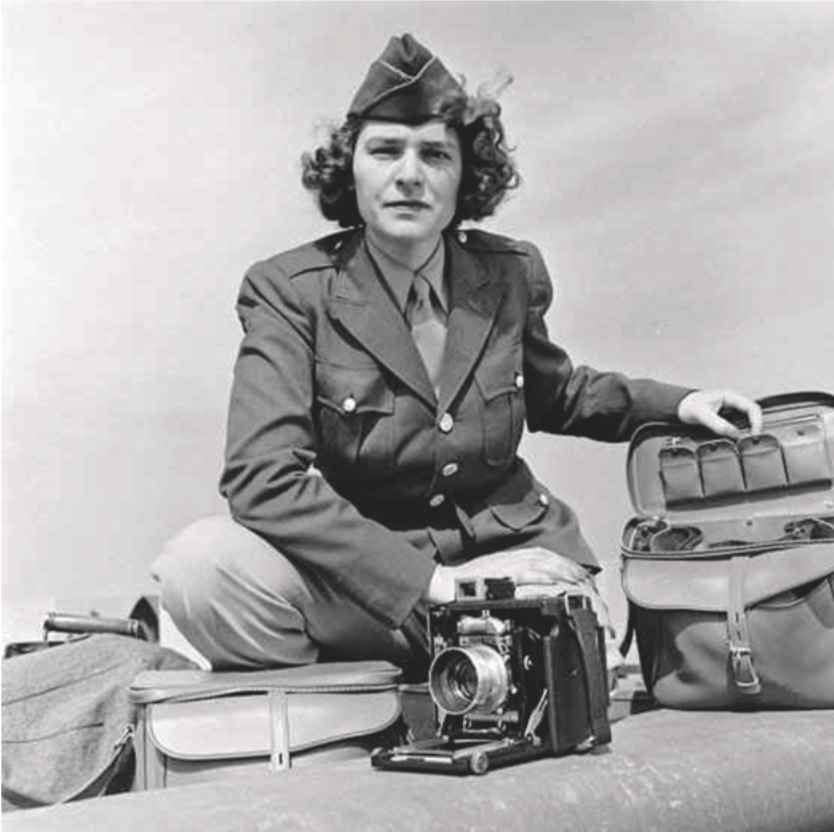
Bourke-White shortly after the liberation of Buchenwald concentration camp

In the spring of 1945 she traveled throughout a collapsing Germany with Gen. George S. Patton. She arrived at Buchenwald, the notorious concentration camp, and later said, "Using a camera was almost a relief. It interposed a slight barrier between myself and the horror in front of me."

After the war, she produced a book entitled Dear Fatherland, Rest Quietly, a project that helped her come to grips with the brutality she had witnessed during and after the war.

The editor of a collection of Bourke-White's photographs wrote: "To many who got in the way of a Bourke-White photograph—and that included not just bureaucrats and functionaries but professional colleagues like assistants, reporters, and other photographers—she was regarded as imperious, calculating, and insensitive."

=== Recording the India–Pakistan partition violence ===
Mohandas K. Gandhi in 1946

Bourke-White is known equally well in both India and Pakistan for her photographs of Dr. Bhimrao Ramji Ambedkar at his home Rajgriha, Dadar in Mumbai on the occasion of a third impression of his book which was published in December 1940 as Thoughts on Pakistan (the book was republished in 1946 under the title India's Political What's What: Pakistan or Partition of India). These photographs were published on the Life magazine cover. She also photographed Mahatma Gandhi and Pakistan's founder, Mohammed Ali Jinnah.

She was "one of the most effective chroniclers" of the violence that erupted at the 1947 independence and partition of India and Pakistan, according to Somini Sengupta, who calls her photographs of the episode "gut-wrenching, and staring at them, you glimpse the photographer's undaunted desire to stare down horror". She recorded streets littered with corpses, dead victims with open eyes, and refugees with vacant eyes. "Bourke-White's photographs seem to scream on the page", Sengupta wrote.

Sixty-six of Bourke-White's photographs of the partition violence featured in a 2006 reissue of Khushwant Singh's 1956 novel about the disruption, Train to Pakistan. In connection with the reissue, many of the photographs in the book were displayed at "the posh shopping center Khan Market" in Delhi, India. "More astonishing than the images blown up large as life was the number of shoppers who seemed not to register them", Sengupta wrote. No memorial to the partition victims exists in India, according to Pramod Kapoor, head of Roli, the Indian publishing house coming out with the new book.

She had a knack for being at the right place at the right time: she interviewed and photographed Mohandas K. Gandhi just a few hours before his assassination in 1948. Alfred Eisenstaedt, her friend and colleague, said one of her strengths was that there was no assignment and no picture that was unimportant to her. She also started the first photography laboratory at Life magazine.

=== Korean War ===
Bourke-White served as a photographer for Life during Korean War of 1950–1953.

== FBI and HUAC ==
The FBI, under J. Edgar Hoover's direction, closely monitored Bourke-White for years, considering her a suspicious individual. Agents read her mail, accessed her personnel files at work, searched her luggage during travel, and relied on informants to keep an active file on her. Despite these efforts, customs officials reported finding "no incriminating evidence", and no intelligence indicated she was ever "active on behalf of the Communist Party". Nevertheless, Hoover labeled Bourke-White and her husband at the time, Erskine Caldwell, as dangerous and placed them in a category for potential internment and incarceration in case any future national emergency arose. In her 1986 biography of Bourke-White, American art historian Vicki Goldberg revealed that in her private notes, Bourke-White never identified as a communist: "I don't belong to Standard Brands. I'm not a reformed C'st. I don't stand so high, being I never was a C'st at all."

Right wing populist journalist Westbrook Pegler began red-baiting Bourke-White in late 1951, noting that she was frequently cited by the House Un-American Activities Committee (HUAC) for having indirect ties to left-leaning groups associated with the Communist Party. Pegler stopped just short of saying Bourke-White was a communist, but frequently alluded to it in his work. Pegler also used the attacks on Bourke-White to go after Time, whose publisher Henry Luce was Bourke-White's employer. Bourke-White maintained that Pegler's personal attacks were partly due to the Hearst media conglomerate, which was going after Luce since Time had run an article noting that William Randolph Hearst and his mistress had found Pegler "boring and annoying." To respond to Pegler's attacks on her character, Bourke-White went on a lecture tour. HUAC never requested her input but she voluntarily wrote and submitted a statement to the committee anyway, explaining her sincere "belief in democracy and her opposition to dictatorship of the left or of the right."

== Later years ==
In 1953, Bourke-White developed her first symptoms of Parkinson's disease. She was forced to slow her career to fight encroaching paralysis. She spent six months in late 1953 and early 1954 traveling across the United States and to British Honduras shooting pictures for Life that resulted in an eleven-page story in the October 11, 1954 issue, "The Jesuits in America." This assignment led to a collaboration with John LaFarge, S.J.on a 1956 book, A Report on the American Jesuits. In 1959 and 1961 she underwent several operations to treat her condition, which effectively ended her tremors but affected her speech. Bourke-White wrote an autobiography, Portrait of Myself, which was published in 1963 and became a bestseller, but she grew increasingly infirm and isolated in her home in Darien, Connecticut. A pension plan set up in the 1950s, "though generous for that time", no longer covered her health-care costs. She also suffered financially from her personal generosity and from "less-than-responsible attendant care".

In 1971, Bourke-White died at Stamford Hospital in Stamford, Connecticut, aged 67, from Parkinson's disease.

== Personal life ==
In 1924, during her studies, she married Everett Chapman, but the couple divorced two years later. Margaret White added her mother's surname, "Bourke", to her name in 1927 and hyphenated it. Bourke-White and novelist Erskine Caldwell were married from 1939 to their divorce in 1942.

== Legacy ==
Photographs by Bourke-White are in the Brooklyn Museum, the Cleveland Museum of Art, the New Mexico Museum of Art and the Museum of Modern Art in New York, as well as in the collection of the Library of Congress. A 160-foot-long photomural she created for NBC in 1933, for the Rotunda in the broadcaster's Rockefeller Center headquarters, was destroyed in the 1950s. In 2014, when the Rotunda and Grand Staircase leading up to it were rebuilt, the photomural was faithfully recreated in digital form on the 360-degree LED screens on the Rotunda's walls. It forms one of the stops on the NBC Studio Tour.

In April 2023, Phillips NY auctioned Gargoyle, Chrysler Building, New York City (c1930) for an above-high estimate $127,000.

Many of her manuscripts, memorabilia, photographs, and negatives are housed in Syracuse University's Bird Library Special Collections section.

== Media portrayals ==
- Candice Bergen played her in the 1982 film Gandhi.
- Farrah Fawcett played her in the 1989 television movie, Double Exposure: The Story of Margaret Bourke-White.
- Megan Fox played a fictional character based on Margaret Bourke-White in the 2019 South Korean war film The Battle of Jangsari.

== Awards ==
- Honorary Doctorate: Rutgers University, 1948
- Honorary Doctorate: University of Michigan (Ann Arbor), 1951
- Achievement Award: US Camera, 1963
- Honor Roll Award: American Society of Magazine Photographers, 1964
- National Women's Hall of Fame, 1990 She was designated a Women's History Month Honoree in 1992 and again in 1994 by the National Women's History Project.
- International Photography Hall of Fame and Museum, 2016

== Publications ==
=== Works ===
- Eyes on Russia (1931)
- You Have Seen Their Faces (1937; with Erskine Caldwell), ISBN 0-8203-1692-X
- North of the Danube (1939; with Erskine Caldwell), ISBN 0-306-70877-9
- Shooting the Russian War (1942)
- They Called it "Purple Heart Valley" (1944)
- Halfway to Freedom; a report on the new India (1949)
- Interview with India,(1950)
- Portrait of Myself. Simon Schuster (1963), ISBN 0-671-59434-6
- Dear Fatherland, Rest Quietly (1946)
- The Taste of War (selections from her writings edited by Jonathan Silverman), ISBN 0-7126-1030-8
- Say, Is This the USA? (republished 1977), ISBN 0-306-77434-8
- The Photographs of Margaret Bourke-White, ISBN 0-517-16603-8

=== Biographies and collections ===
- Margaret Bourke-White: Photography of Design, 1927–1936, ISBN 0-8478-2505-1
- Margaret Bourke-White, ISBN 0-8109-4381-6
- Margaret Bourke-White: Photographer, ISBN 0-8212-2490-5
- Margaret Bourke-White: Adventurous Photographer, ISBN 0-531-12405-3
- Power and Paper, Margaret Bourke-White: Modernity and the Documentary Mode, ISBN 1-881450-09-0
- Margaret Bourke-White: A Biography by Vickie Goldberg (Harper & Row, 1986), ISBN 0-06-015513-2
- Bourke-White: A Retrospective, Collected and Circulated by the International Center of Photography, New York. Exhibition catalog United Technologies Corporation, 1988
- Margaret Bourke-White: Twenty Parachutes, Nazraeli Press, 2002, ISBN 1-59005-013-4
- Margaret Bourke-White: The Early Work, 1922–1930. Selected, with an essay by Ronald E. Ostman and Harry Littel (David E Godine, 2005), ISBN 9781567922998
- For the World to See: The Life of Margaret Bourke-White by Jonathan Silverman, ISBN 0-670-32356-X
- Down North: John Buchan and Margaret Bourke-White on the Mackenzie by John Brinckman, ISBN 978-0-9879163-3-4
- Witness to Life and Freedom: Margaret Bourke-White in India & Pakistan by Pramod Kapoor (Roli & Janssen, 2010), ISBN 9788174366993

=== Exhibitions ===
Group

- John Becker Gallery, New York: 1931 (Photographs by Three Americans, with Ralph Steiner and Walker Evans)
- Museum of Modern Art, New York:1949 (Six Women Photographers, 1951 (Memorable Life Photographs))

Solo

- Annual Exhibition of Advertising Art, New York: 1931 (with Anton Bruehl; art works by others)
- Little Carnegie Playhouse, New York: 1932
- Rockefeller Center, New York: 1932
- Art Institute of Chicago: 1956
- Syracuse University, NY: 1966
- Carl Siembab Gallery, Boston: 1971
- Witkin Gallery, New York: 1971
- Andrew Dickson White Museum of Art, Cornell University, Ithaca: 1972 (retrospective)
- National Museum of Women in the Arts, Washington, D.C.: 1989 (retrospective)

=== Public collections ===
- Art Institute of Chicago, Chicago, IL
- Brooklyn Museum
- Cleveland Museum of Art
- Library of Congress
- Museum of Modern Art, New York City
- New Mexico Museum of Art
- Rijksmuseum Amsterdam
