= William F. Ekstrom Library =

Coordinates: 38°13′00.7″N 85°45′37.4″W

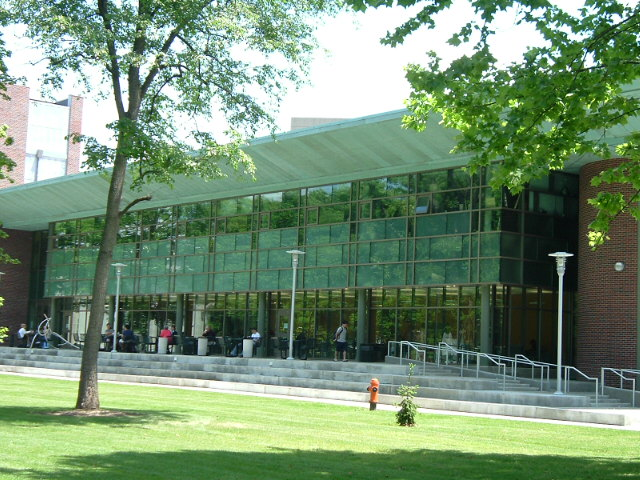
- William F. Ekstrom Library
- Location: Louisville, Kentucky, United States
- Type: Academic library

Other information
- Website: louisville.edu/library/ekstrom

The William F. Ekstrom Library is the main branch of the University of Louisville Libraries system. Located on the university's Belknap Campus in Louisville, Kentucky, Ekstrom Library contains collections in the humanities, sciences, and social sciences. The University of Louisville Libraries is a member of the Association of Research Libraries (ARL) and, along with Ekstrom, includes libraries for Art, Health Sciences, Law, and Music, as well as the Archives and Special Collections. The University of Louisville Libraries hold approximately 2.2 million print volumes, subscribe to several thousand serials, and provide full-text electronic access to approximately 74,000 journals. Ekstrom is a Federal Depository Library and houses the largest selective government document collection in Kentucky.

== History ==
The University Library grew from an original donation of Dean John Letcher Patterson's personal collection in the early 1900s. By 1950, the library had over 36,000 books in its collection. In 1956, the university gave the library its own building (now Schneider Hall) to accommodate the growing collection.

By 1970, the collection contained over 200,000 items. At the end of the 1970s, the University Library building reached capacity, forcing parts of the collection to be placed in storage. Plans were made to create a new $14 million library to accommodate the growing collection. Named after Dr. William F. Ekstrom, a noted English professor and the first Academic Vice-president of the university, the Ekstrom Library opened on August 28, 1981.

At the same time as the opening of Ekstrom Library, all the university's branch libraries, except for Law, were placed under the leadership of the University Librarian, rather than the deans of the corresponding schools.

The new 230,000 sq ft (21,000 m^{2}) building was designed by the Architect firm Louis & Henry of Louisville, Kentucky. The brick and exposed concrete design of the building incorporated the character of the open spaces on campus and the surrounding structures. The large glass windows featured a glazing system that allowed restricted solar heating. The new library earned the Kentucky Society of Architects Merit Award for outstanding design.

The University Libraries were invited to join the Association of college and Research Libraries (ARL) as its 124th member in 2002. The offer was based on ARL's assessment of scope of the Libraries' collections, uniqueness of resources, contributions to scholarship, and research contributions to the field of information science.

In 2006, a new wing was added to the library at a cost of $14.9 million. The new 51,000 sq.ft., three-story addition featured the relocated McConnell Center for Political Leadership, a new 24-hour study area, a café, new instruction labs, an auditorium, and the new Robotic Retrieval System (RRS). This temperature and humidity-controlled storage system, one of the first in the nation, has a 600,000 volume capacity and retrieves patron requests in approximately 2 minutes.

== Collections and departments ==
The Senator Mitch McConnell and Secretary Elaine L. Chao Archives in basement of the Library

Ekstrom Library houses or provides access to several unique collections, including but not limited to:

- The Granville Bunton African American Collection—over 4,000 volumes focusing on African American and Pan African history, literature, and culture
- The Bingham Poetry Collection—over 6,000 volumes of poetry, with an emphasis on North American and British poetry
- The Louise Galloway Browsing Collection—a revolving collection of popular interest titles and bestsellers
- The Student Government Association Video Collection—a collection of feature films funded by the University of Louisville Student Government Association
- The Senator Mitch McConnell and Secretary Elaine L. Chao Archives

Archives and Special Collections, considered a separate library, is headquartered within Ekstrom Library. It includes 1) Photographic Archives housing nearly 2 million photographs, 2) Rare Books and manuscripts focusing on local, regional, national, and international topics, 3) the University Archives and Records Center, and 4) the Digital Initiatives office which is responsible for digital collections of images, documents, and oral histories.

Reference librarians at Ekstrom Library answer questions in person at the reference desk on the first floor or by phone, instant message chat, or e-mail. Individual research advisory appointments with a reference librarian are also offered.

Ekstrom Library's Special Services Office helps those with disabilities use the library. In addition to providing adaptive technology equipment, library staff aid in retrieving books, making photocopies, and locating library materials.

Other departments at Ekstrom Library include Circulation, Collection Development, Copyright Permissions Services, Current Periodicals and Microforms, Distance Learning Library Services, Information Literacy, Interlibrary Loan, Media Resources, Office of Libraries' Technology, Office of the University Libraries' Dean, Stacks Maintenance, and Technical Services.

== Endowed Chair for Scholarly Communication ==
Established in 1997 and funded by the estate of a former University of Louisville librarian and Kentucky's Research Challenge Trust Fund, the Evelyn J. Schneider Endowed Chair for Scholarly Communication was the state's first endowed library chair. The chair holder, whose office is located in Ekstrom Library, focuses on concerns and policies related to scholarly communication and copyright law at the university, state, and national levels.

== University units located in Ekstrom Library ==
In addition to Ekstrom Library's services and collections, the library is home to several university organizations, including:

- Delphi Center for Enhancing Teaching & Learning - The center aids teaching through technological instruction assistance, distance education services, and development of education-related software.
- University Writing Center - The center helps students and faculty improve their writing through individualized and group assistance.
- Muhammad Ali Institute for Peace and Justice - The institute's mission is to "advance the work, study and practice of peacemaking, social justice and violence prevention through the development of innovative educational programs, training, service and research."
- Anne Braden Institute for Social Justice Research - The institute honors civil rights activist Anne Braden through academic research related to social justice, particularly in Louisville and the South.
- McConnell Center for Political Leadership - The center provides guidance to undergraduates interested in politics and government to become future leaders in the community.
