= Donald Pizer =

American academic and literary critic (1929–2023)

- Born: April 5, 1929; New York City, U.S.
- Died: November 7, 2023 (aged 94); New Orleans, Louisiana, U.S.
- Education: University of California, Los Angeles
- Occupation: Academic
- Employer: Tulane University
- Children: 3

Donald Pizer (April 5, 1929 – November 7, 2023) was an American academic and literary critic who was regarded as one of the principal authorities on the American naturalism literary movement. He was the Pierce Butler Professor of English Emeritus at Tulane University, and the author of numerous books on naturalism. He was awarded a Guggenheim Fellowship in 1962.

For University of Georgia professor James Nagel, Pizer "has made enormous contributions to the study of naturalism in the period from 1890 through World War II, with a score or more of books on Jack London, Hamlin Garland, Theodore Dreiser, Frank Norris, John Dos Passos, the 1890s, and twentieth-century fiction."

In 1971 he presented the paper, "Dreiser 's Fiction: The Editorial Problem" for the A.S.W. Rosenbach Lectures in Bibliography to mark the Theodore Dreiser Centenary.

After retiring from teaching in 2001, Pizer carried on with his research and writing up until a few years before his death on November 7, 2023, at the age of 94.

== Works ==
- Pizer, Donald (1964). The Literary Criticism of Frank Norris. New York: Russell & Russell. OCLC 891427579.
- Pizer, Donald (1966). Realism and Naturalism in Nineteenth-Century American Literature. Carbondale, Illinois: Southern Illinois University Press. OCLC 6610058.
- Pizer, Donald (1976). The Novels of Theodore Dreiser: A Critical Study. Minneapolis, Minnesota: University of Minnesota Press. ISBN 081660768-0. OCLC 7520769.
- Pizer, Donald (1996). The Theory and Practice of American Literary Naturalism: Selected Essays and Reviews. Carbondale, Illinois: Southern Illinois University Press. ISBN 9780809318476. OCLC 256706016.
- Pizer, Donald (2002). The Cambridge Companion to American Realism and Naturalism: Howells to London. Cambridge, U.K.: Cambridge University Press. ISBN 9780521438766. OCLC 935574928.
- Pizer, Donald (2008). American Naturalism and the Jews: Garland, Norris, Dreiser, Wharton, and Cather. Urbana, Illinois: University of Illinois Press. ISBN 9780252033438. OCLC 470680491.
- Pizer, Donald (2014). The Significant Hamlin Garland: A Collection of Essays. New York: Anthem Press. ISBN 9781783083053. OCLC 905564865.
- Pizer, Donald, Lisa Nanney, and Richard Layman (2017). The Paintings and Drawings of John Dos Passos: A Collection and Study. Clemson, SC: Clemson University Press. ISBN 9781942954217. OCLC 987526434.
- Pizer, Donald, ed. (2018). Theodore Dreiser Recalled. Clemson, SC: Clemson University Press. ISBN 9781942954446. OCLC 990141401.
- Dos Passos, John. Ed. Donald Pizer (2020). Manhattan Transfer: An Annotated Edition. Clemson, SC: Clemson University Press. ISBN 9781949979619. OCLC 1450715016. Available Open Access on Project Muse: https://muse.jhu.edu/book/125831
