= Wendy Snyder MacNeil =

American photographer and professor (1943–2016)

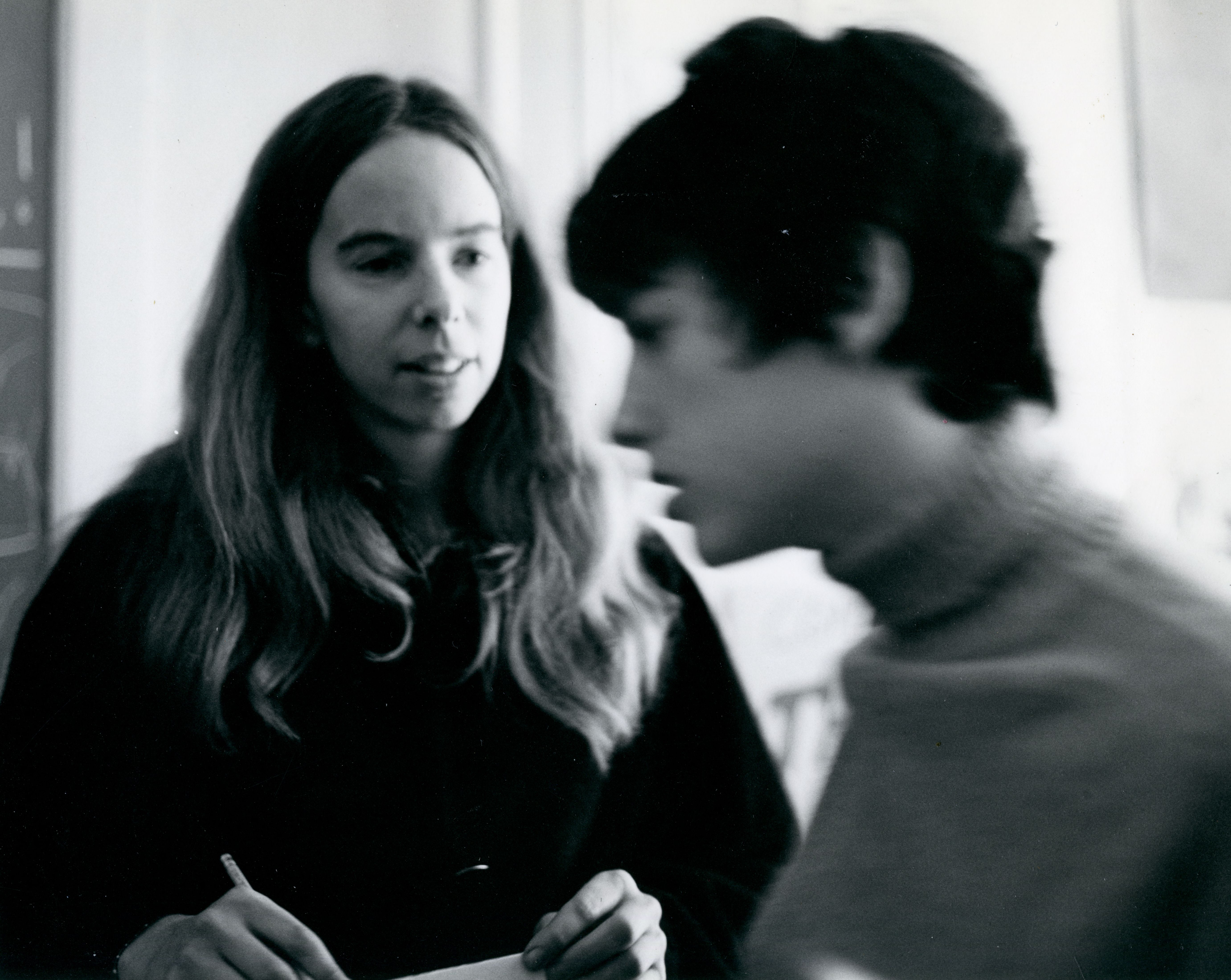
- Born: October 15, 1943
- Died: July 20, 2016 (aged 72)
- Education: Massachusetts Institute of Technology
- Occupations: Photographer; filmmaker; professor

Wendy Snyder MacNeil (October 15, 1943 – July 20, 2016) was an American photographer, filmmaker and professor. MacNeil is known primarily for her portrait photography.

== Early life and education ==
In the late 1960s, MacNeil was a student of the photographer Minor White at the Massachusetts Institute of Technology in Boston.

== Career ==
From 1976 to 2007, MacNeil was a professor of art at the Rhode Island School of Design (RISD). In 1973 she was named as a Guggenheim fellow.

Her work is included in the collection of the Museum of Fine Arts Houston, and the Metropolitan Museum of Art. Her archive is held by the Ryerson Image Centre, Toronto.
