= You Have Seen Their Faces =

1937 book by Erskine Caldwell and Margaret Bourke-White

- First p/b edition (publ. Modern Age Press)
- Author: Erskine Caldwell and Margaret Bourke-White
- Publisher: Viking Press
- Publication date: 1937

You Have Seen Their Faces is a 1937 book by novelist Erskine Caldwell and photographer Margaret Bourke-White, first published by Viking Press. A paperback version by Modern Age Books was released a few years later. The book depicts poverty and economic hardship in the American South during the Great Depression, highlighting the plight of tenant farmers, sharecroppers, and chain gangs in that region. The book was a commercial success. There are three editions of the book published in 1937, 1975, and 1995.

== Development ==
Photographer Margaret Bourke-White was initially known for her commercial work focusing on architectural and industrial photography for corporate clients. Her interest in documentary photography began in the mid 1930s when she began focusing less on industry and more on people, first with a photo essay of the Dust Bowl for Fortune in 1934. She began working for Life as a photographer in late 1936.

The book's title is reminiscent of Can You Hear Their Voices?, a 1931 play by Hallie Flanagan and Margaret Ellen Clifford, based on the short story "Can You Make Out Their Voices" by Whittaker Chambers. According to writer Iris Noble, the idea for naming the book You Have Seen Their Faces belonged to novelist Erskine Caldwell, Bourke-White's collaborator.

== Contents ==
Bourke-White and Caldwell traveled for eighteen months documenting the American South documenting sharecroppers in the American South, with Bourke-White taking photos and Caldwell writing the text. Together, they both wrote captions for the photos. Their travels took them through almost 50 towns in eight states: Arkansas, Mississippi, Georgia, Louisiana, Alabama, South Carolina, Tennessee, and Florida. A 1975 reprint notes a disclaimer at the beginning of the book that says the captions are "intended to express the authors’ own conceptions of the sentiments of the individuals portrayed; they do not pretend to reproduce the actual sentiments of these persons." An updated introduction by Caldwell dated 1974 also appears in the 1975 edition. An afterward by Bourke-White titled "Notes on photographs", explains the technical requirements for the photography side of the project, including lighting and the use of five different cameras, and the need to get permission for their shoots. This was a problem shooting the chain gang scenes in Hood's Chapel, Georgia, as the guard threatened to shoot them if they took photos. Eventually, they were able to get an official letter of permission, but when they returned and presented it to the guard, he revealed he was illiterate.

== Critical reception ==
In a positive review of the book in 1940, American sociologist and anthropologist Frank H. Hankins called it "a telling account of the South's poor rural population", and called the photos "remarkably good" and the captions "interesting and moving case histories". Reflecting on the book in 2009, novelist Caleb Crain of The New Yorker gave the book a negative review when surveying Morris Dickstein's Dancing in the Dark, a cultural history of the U.S. in the 1930s. Crain criticized Bourke-White's methods as "sentimental and grotesque" and their captions as offensively "contrived".

== Influence ==
This book inspired James Agee to write Let Us Now Praise Famous Men (1941).

== Publishing history ==
The book was originally published in November 1937 by Modern Age Books in New York. It was reprinted with a new introduction by Caldwell in 1975 by Arno Press in New York. Brown Thrasher Books of the University of Georgia Press in Athens, Georgia, republished it with a new foreword by American historian Alan Trachtenberg in 1995.
