= Vicki Goldberg =

American photography historian (1936–2025)

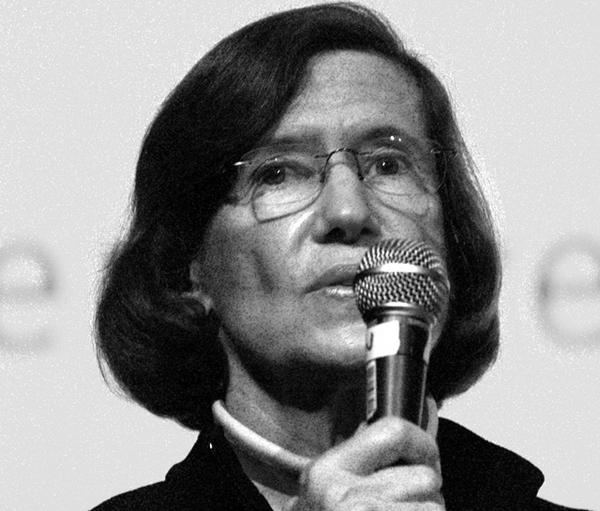
- Born: Victoria Hesse Liebson; July 24, 1936; St. Louis, Missouri, U.S.
- Died: May 29, 2025 (aged 88); New York City, U.S.
- Other names: Victoria Hesse Goldberg
- Occupation(s): Photography critic, author, and photo historian
- Awards: Infinity Award – International Center of Photography 1997; J Dudley Johnston Award – Royal Photographic Society 1999

Victoria Hesse Goldberg (née Liebson; July 24, 1936 – May 29, 2025) was an American photography critic, author and photo historian based in New Hampshire. She wrote books and articles on photography and its social history.

== Early life and education ==
Born in St. Louis, Missouri on July 24, 1936, Goldberg earned a bachelor's degree from Wellesley College in 1958, and a master's degree in art history from New York University Institute of Fine Arts.

== Life and work ==
Goldberg's books include The Power of Photography: How Photographs Changed Our Lives; Light Matters (a selection of her essays); and The White House: The President's Home in Photographs and History; as well as editing the anthology Photography in Print: Writings from 1816 to the Present. Her first biography, Margaret Bourke-White, took an in-depth look at the life and techniques of Margaret Bourke-White, a photographer active in the early to mid-20th century. Goldberg co-wrote A Nation of Strangers: Essays with Arthur Ollman, and American Photography: A Century of Images with art historian Robert Silberman. She also wrote introductions to a number of photographic monographs. Margaret Bourke-White and The Power of Photography were included in the American Library Association's lists of best books of their respective years. In 2006, Photography in Print was named by The Wall Street Journal one of the year's five best books on photography.

Goldberg wrote for The New York Times and Vanity Fair. In 1992, she wrote an article about Madonna's book Sex in the New York Times. She lectured in Belgium, England, France, China, Korea, Norway and Portugal as well as America. She later worked as a freelance writer and lecturer.

== Personal life and death ==
In 1957, she married David Goldberg, and had two sons. They divorced in 1973. She was later married to graphic designer and illustrator Loring Eutemey, and to Laurence R. Young, a professor of astronautics at the Massachusetts Institute of Technology.

Goldberg died from brain cancer in Manhattan, New York City, on May 29, 2025, at the age of 88.

== Awards ==
- 1997: International Center of Photography's Infinity Award
- 1999: Royal Photographic Society's J Dudley Johnston Award

== General references ==
- Vicki Goldberg Biography at the Biography Resource Center
