= Perry T. Rathbone =

American curator (1911–2000)

Perry Townsend Rathbone
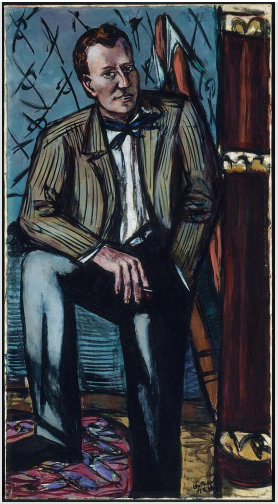
- "Perry T. Rathbone" by Max Beckmann
- Born: July 3, 1911; Germantown, Philadelphia, Pennsylvania
- Died: January 22, 2000 (aged 88); Cambridge, Massachusetts
- Education: Harvard University
- Spouse: Euretta de Cosson Rathbone (m. 1945)

6th Director of the Museum of Fine Arts, Boston
- In office 1955–1972
- Preceded by: George Harold Edgell
- Succeeded by: Merrill C. Rueppel

5th Director of the Saint Louis Art Museum
- In office 1940–1955
- Preceded by: Meyric R. Rogers
- Succeeded by: Charles Nagel

Perry Townsend Rathbone (July 3, 1911 – January 22, 2000) was one of the leading American art museum directors of the 20th century. As director of the St. Louis Art Museum from 1940 to 1955, and the Museum of Fine Arts, Boston from 1955 to 1972, he transformed these institutions from quiet repositories of art to vibrant cultural centers. Known for his sensitive installations as well as his bold publicity stunts, he increased the membership and attendance figures of both institutions exponentially, and also added significant works to their permanent collections across the board.

== Biography ==
=== Early years ===
Rathbone was born in the Germantown neighborhood of Philadelphia, Pennsylvania, on July 3, 1911, and spent his early childhood in New York City where his father, Howard Betts Rathbone, worked as a salesman. His mother, Beatrice Connely Rathbone, was a school nurse. In 1917 the family moved to New Rochelle, New York, where Perry and his older brother Westcott attended the local public schools. Perry entered Harvard College as a freshman in the fall of 1929 with the class of 1933. At Harvard he majored in art history and went on to take the graduate course with Professor Paul Sachs called "Museum Work and Museum Problems," which was responsible for training the first generation of museum professionals in America. Rathbone's classmates in the museum course included Henry McIlhenny, Charles Cunningham, John Newberry, and James Plaut.

=== Professional life ===
Upon completing the museum course in 1934, Rathbone's first job was as a lecturer in the education department of the Detroit Institute of Arts. In 1936 he was appointed curator of Alger House, a branch museum in Grosse Point, Michigan, where he lived with DIA director William Valentiner. In 1939 he assisted Valentiner in organizing the Masterpieces of Art exhibition at the World's Fair in New York. In 1940 Rathbone was appointed director of the St. Louis Art Museum (then the City Art Museum). At age 29, he was the youngest museum director in America. From 1943 to 1945 he served in the U.S. Navy in Washington, D.C., as head of combat artists, and in New Caledonia as an officer. Upon returning from New Caledonia he married Euretta de Cosson, a British ski champion, on February 10, 1945. Three children were born to the Rathbones in St. Louis: Peter (1946), Eliza (1948), and Belinda (1950). Rathbone also was instrumental in helping the German artist Max Beckmann move to America after the war by securing him a teaching position at Washington University in St. Louis, and organized his first major retrospective in the U.S. at the St. Louis Museum. He was a champion of modern art, and along with Joseph Pulitzer Jr., and Morton May, stimulated many other collectors of modern art in St. Louis.

Rathbone added key works to the permanent collection in St. Louis, including Winslow Homer's The Country School, David Smith's Cockfight, Montorsoli's Reclining Pan, and a Sumerian bull's head. He was also responsible for many popular exhibitions, some of regional interest, such as Mississippi Panorama and Westward the Way, others international, such as the 1949 blockbuster Treasures from Berlin, which attracted an average of 12,634 visitors per day.

In 1955 Rathbone left St. Louis to become director of the Boston Museum of Fine Arts (MFA). In Boston he formed the first "Ladies Committee" for the museum with Frances Weeks Hallowell, a successful strategy for increasing membership and broadening the MFA's base of support. Rathbone staged unprecedented loan exhibitions such as European Art of Our Time and The Age of Rembrandt, renovated more than fifty galleries, and increased the annual sale of publications by 1000 per cent. As temporary head of the paintings department while also serving as the museum's director, he added notable works to the collection such as Rosso Fiorentino's Dead Christ with Angels, Claude Monet's La Japonaise, Giovanni Battista Tiepolo's Time Unveiling Truth, and the anonymous fifteenth-century Flemish Martyrdom of Saint Hippolytus. Arriving at the MFA in the mid-fifties, Rathbone was the first director to build their collection of modern and contemporary art, including the museum's first Picasso oil, Standing Figure, 1908, first painting by Edvard Munch, The Voice, and first Jackson Pollock, Number 10, 1949. He attracted gifts from important collectors such as Maxim Karolik and Alvan Fuller, and the Forsyth Wickes collection of eighteenth-century French art. He also acquired, in 1969, a small portrait thought to be by Raphael, which was subsequently returned to Italy amidst a storm of controversy over its exportation and attribution to Raphael. This incident led to Rathbone's early retirement from the MFA.

After resigning from the MFA in 1972 Rathbone was made head of the New York offices of Christie's, and in 1977 when the firm began to hold auctions in New York, was made Museums Liaison Officer. For the period between these positions, he advised the Chase Manhattan Bank on its art acquisitions. He retired in 1985, but continued to act as a consultant.

Selections from Rathbone's journals of 1953 to 1974 were edited and published by his daughter Belinda in 2024.

== Honors ==
- Honorary Phi Beta Kappa, Harvard University, 1958
- Honorary Doctor of Arts (Art.D.), Washington University in St. Louis, 1958
- Honorary Doctor of Humane Letters (D.H.L.), Northeastern University, 1960
- Honorary Doctor of Fine Arts (D.F.A.), Bates College, 1964
- Chevalier de Légion d'Honneur, 1964
- Honorary Doctor of Humane Letters (D.H.L.), Williams College, 1970
- Honorary Doctor of Fine Arts (D.F.A.), Rhode Island School of Design, 1982
- President, Association of Art Museum Directors, 1959–60, 1969–70

== Selected bibliography ==
- Museum of Fine Arts, Boston, "The Rathbone Years," 1972
- Museum of Fine Arts, Boston, "Back Bay Boston: The City as a Work of Art," 1969
- Museum of Fine Arts, Boston, "The Age of Rembrandt," 1966
- Museum of Modern Art, New York, "Max Beckmann," 1964 (with Peter Seltz)
- City Art Museum, St. Louis, "Westward the Way," 1955
- City Art Museum, St. Louis, "Mississippi Panorama," 1950
- City Art Museum, St. Louis, "Max Beckmann," 1948
- City Art Museum, St. Louis, "Charles Wimar: Painter of the Indian Frontier," 1946
