= Euretta de Cosson Rathbone =

British ski racer (died 2003)

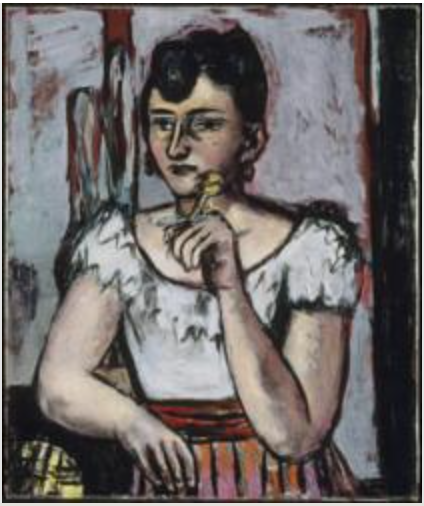
- Portrait by Max Beckmann, 1947
- Born: Euretta Cecilia de Cosson; 1909; Cairo, Egypt
- Died: 2003 (aged 93–94); Cambridge, Massachusetts
- Known for: Captain of the British women's ski team
- Spouse: Perry Townsend Rathbone (m. 1945)
- Father: Claude Augustin de Cosson
- Relatives: Charles Alexander de Cosson (grandfather)

Euretta Cecilia de Cosson Rathbone (died 2003) was a British champion ski racer and a patron of the arts. Rettles, as she was known, was born in Cairo, Egypt to the British head of Egypt's public works Claude Augustin de Cosson and Euretta Kirkbride, a Philadelphian descendant of a long line of Philadelphia Quakers and Industrialists. Her grandfather was Charles Alexander, Baron de Cosson (1846–1929), a scholar and collector of arms and armour who was among the leading English authorities on the subject in his time. Her father's family were French nobility from Bourg in the Gironde who emigrated to England during the French Revolution. An ancestor, François Honoré de Cosson, seigneur de Nodeau et d'Esconges, was condemned to death as a counter-revolutionary on 28 Prairial Year II (16 June 1794) by the military commission at Bordeaux during the Reign of Terror and guillotined.

She took up skiing while in finishing school in Switzerland. She became captain of the British ski team and won several events, but never competed in the olympics as they were cancelled due to World War II. She won a combined event in 1939. She suffered a concussion in competition on Baldy Mountain in 1941.

She married art museum director Perry T. Rathbone in 1945. She died in 2003 after being hit by a bus. She had three children and seven grandchildren.
