= Hallene Hill =

American actress

- Hallene Hill in The Andy Griffith Show 1963
- Born: September 12, 1876
- Died: January 6, 1966 (aged 89)

Hallene Hill was an American actress best known for her roles in the play Tobacco Road and the films Tramp, Tramp, Tramp (1942) and The Search for Bridey Murphy (1956). Having reached the peak of her career later in life, Hill was often cast as a grandmother or "little old lady."

== Career ==
In 1929, Hill appeared in the play This is College by Madeline Blackmore and Charles Crouch, acting alongside Marion Aye, Marjorie Bonner, and Duane Thompson, among others. In 1936, Hill played Gramda Lester in a production of the play Tobacco Road, adapted by Jack Kirkland from the novel of the same name by Erskine Caldwell. The cast also included Henry Hull, Haila Stoddard, and Donald Barry.

During the 1950s and 1960s, Hill appeared in guest roles on various popular television shows, including The Andy Griffith Show, Lassie, 77 Sunset Strip, and The Adventures of Ozzie and Harriet. She also appeared in various roles on eight episodes of The Jack Benny Program.

Hill made uncredited appearances in numerous films, including The Gang's All Here (1943), Spartacus (1960) and The Thrill of It All (1963).

She was sometimes credited as Halline Hill.

== Filmography ==
=== Film (Credited) ===
- Hello, Everybody! (1933) as Mrs. Thompson
- The Arkansas Traveler (1938) as Old Lady
- Remedy for Riches (1940) as Abby Purdy
- Tramp, Tramp, Tramp! (1942) as Granny
- The Search for Bridey Murphy (1956) as Bridey Murphy at Age 66

=== Television ===
- The Roy Rogers Show (1952) as Granny
- The Abbot and Costello Show (1953) as Mrs. Gillicuddy
- Omnibus (1953) as Mrs. Watson
- The Loretta Young Show (1954) as Pearl
- Fireside Theatre (1955)
- My Little Margie (1955) as Mrs. Edith Bishop
- The Adventures of Ozzie and Harriet (1955) as Elderly Peek-A-Boo Lady
- Lassie (1957) as Liz Barton
- Four Star Playhouse (1956) as Millie
- Blondie (1957) as Miss Peabody
- Noah's Ark (1957) as Mrs. Banner
- General Electric Theater (1957) as Mrs. Fenton
- M Squad (1957) as Aunt Millie
- Official Detective (1957) as Marian Shepherd
- The Millionaire (1958) as Edna Morton
- Bachelor Father (1958) as Mrs. Mitchell
- 77 Sunset Strip (1959) as Rachel Baker
- The Slowest Gun in the West (1960) as Mrs. Hotchkiss
- Manhunt (1961) as Wooden Witness
- Thriller (1962) as The Old Woman
- The Andy Griffith Show (1963) as Mrs. Rose Temple
- Gomer Pyle: USMC (1964) as Mother
- The Jack Benny Program (1953-1965) 8 episodes in various roles

=== Stage ===
- This is College (1929)
- Tobacco Road (1936)
