= Place Called Estherville =

First edition

Place Called Estherville is a Southern Gothic novel written by Erskine Caldwell, most famous for his novels Tobacco Road and God's Little Acre. The book was first published in 1949 by Duell, Sloan & Pearce and later published in paperback by Signet Books. It would go on to sell more than 1.5 million copies.

The novel centers on a biracial brother and sister, Ganus and Kathyanne Bazemore. After their mother dies, they move to a segregated town called Estherville to help take care of their sick aunt. They face abuse from the town that culminates in tragedy.

== Plot ==
=== Part One: Early Spring ===
Chapter One

The novel opens with Ganus who is working as a servant in the home of a prominent white family. One Sunday morning while the parents are at church, young-adult daughter Stephena enters the kitchen and flirts with Ganus, making him feel uncomfortable because he is concerned about being caught alone with a white woman. She forces him to perform a demeaning task, then she has him deliver her breakfast in bed. When he gets there she is naked. She bites his arm while trying to get him to hold her.

Chapter Two

Kathyanne is working at the home of George Swayne. His domineering wife Norma is away visiting family and George takes the opportunity to approach Kathyanne. She is not receptive to his sexual advances, so he rapes her. During the rape she asks him if it would be any different if she were white, but George fails to respond. Kathyanne states that she will have to quit her job so as not to offend Norma.

Chapter Three

On the way home from work, Ganus is beaten by several white teens who threaten to castrate him if he continues to work for Stephena's family. One of the teens saw him alone with her in the family's garage where she had instructed him to do pullups for her; they claim that he was showing off. An adult arrives and the teens run off.

Chapter Four

Kathyanne finds work at the home of a woman named Madgie, who doesn't pay her for several weeks. When Kathyanne asks for her pay, Madgie tries to give her used clothing instead of money. Kathyanne explains that she doesn't need clothes; she needs money for food and rent. Madgie states that Negroes beg for money because they don’t know how to take care of themselves and blames all of Kathyanne’s financial problems on Kathyanne and her family. Madgie eventually uses a racial slur and Kathyanne quits, but since she can't secure a reference, she can't find other work.

=== Part Two: Midsummer ===
Chapter Five

Ganus needs a bicycle to start a job as a delivery person for a local grocer, but does not have the funds to pay for one. Claude, who owns the bicycle store, sends Ganus to Dr. English, who agrees to buy the bicycle for Ganus if Ganus pays double the cost of the bike and makes payments each week until the bicycle is paid for. Should Ganus miss a payment, Dr. English will take the bicycle and keep whatever payments Ganus has made. The offer is crooked, but Ganus agrees to the terms because he has no other choice.

Chapter Six

Several white teens track down Kathyanne and attempt to gang-rape her. When the sheriff arrives, the teens run off. The sheriff refuses to believe Kathyanne’s story and threatens to put her in jail unless she has sex with him. She refuses to concede, so he beats her and throws her in jail.

Chapter Seven

Ganus is working as the delivery person for the local grocer and is asked to take a package to a Miss Vernice. She has made sexual advances to Ganus in the past, so he is reluctant to deliver the groceries, but does so for fear of losing his job. He quickly leaves the house before Miss Vernice can make any advances, but she calls for another delivery. When Ganus returns she forces him to drink some alcohol and he eventually gets drunk. It is assumed that the two have sex and that Ganus passes out. He ends up getting fired for not reporting back to the grocery store.

Chapter Eight

Roy Blount, Kathyanne’s employer before George Swayne, is entertaining prospective clients who demand that Roy secure sex workers for the evening. Unaware of any brothels in town, he drives the men to Kathyanne’s house and asks to speak to her. When she comes out, he propositions her, but she declines, at which point he takes hold of her and forces her into the car where the two men are waiting. It is assumed that they gang-rape her.

=== Part Three: Late Autumn ===
Chapter Nine

Ganus is trying to sell ice in late autumn and is unsuccessful. After several hours, a woman named Kitty invites him in to get warm. She offers him food and he accepts, agreeing to make dinner for Kitty in return. He eventually falls asleep on the kitchen floor as he is tired and Kitty’s boyfriend arrives home and assumes that Kitty has been unfaithful. He beats her and Ganus, though Ganus gets the least of it and is told to leave under the threat of future reprisals.

Chapter Ten

Kathyanne is entertaining a Black farm hand named Henry who is courting her. She is reluctant to return his affection and he eventually reveals that there are rumours she sleeps with white men and thinks she is too good for the Black men in town. Clyde, the property manager, arrives to speak to Kathyanne and asks Henry to leave them alone. Clyde’s boss has demanded that Kathyanne and Ganus pay their rent or be evicted, but Clyde offers to sign off on the rent receipt without payment if Kathyanne will have sex with him. She tells him to sign the receipt now, or not at all, refusing to have sex with him. Clyde, feeling guilty and defeated, signs the receipt and leaves.

Chapter Eleven

Ganus has taken to setting rabbit traps. On his way out to the fields, a woman named Mozelle, who is married to a violent racist named Burgess, asks Ganus to buy her a gift. Impoverished and wary of being caught interacting with white women, he declines. Mozelle threatens that Ganus will be sorry and then runs off to tell her husband that Ganus raped her. Though he does not believe Mozelle, Burgess tracks down Ganus and kills him with an axe. He faces no charges.

Chapter Twelve

Dr. Horatio Plowden is awakened at 2:00 in the morning and finds an envelope with Kathyanne’s name on it and $100 inside. On his way to Kathyanne’s house he runs into the sheriff who asks him why he still works at his age. Plowden says that he hopes he will work until he dies, stating that he wants to help people and he would be happiest if he died on the way home from helping a patient. The two speak about race issues, and Plowden chastises the sheriff for his racist behaviour and promises that change will come and people like him will not be tolerated. Plowden arrives at Kathyanne’s home where there are two midwives who have already taken care of the birth. The baby is in a basket and the doctor sees that the baby appears white and is therefore the child of one of Kathyanne’s rapists. Plowden gives Kathyanne the $100 and assumes that the baby is George’s since it had been about nine months since Kathyanne worked for him. He gives Kathyanne a reassuring speech, gives his regard for her dead brother and leaves. As soon as he's outside, he falls to the ground dead.
