= Tobacco Road (film) =

1941 film by John Ford

- Theatrical release poster
- Directed by: John Ford
- Screenplay by: Nunnally Johnson
- Based on: Tobacco Road; 1932 novel by: Erskine Caldwell; Tobacco Road 1933 play; by Jack Kirkland
- Produced by: Darryl F. Zanuck
- Starring: Charley Grapewin; Marjorie Rambeau; Gene Tierney; William Tracy
- Cinematography: Arthur C. Miller
- Edited by: Barbara McLean
- Music by: David Buttolph
- Color process: Black and white
- Production company: 20th Century Fox
- Distributed by: 20th Century Fox
- Release date: March 7, 1941
- Running time: 85 minutes
- Country: United States
- Language: English
- Box office: $1,900,000 (US) (1973)

Tobacco Road is a 1941 American Southern Gothic film directed by John Ford and starring Charley Grapewin, Marjorie Rambeau, Gene Tierney and William Tracy. It was based on the 1932 novel of the same name by Erskine Caldwell and the 1933 Broadway play that Jack Kirkland adapted from the novel. The plot was rewritten for the film by Nunnally Johnson, who had worked with Ford on The Grapes of Wrath the previous year; the plot was altered to fit Production Code demands for a lighter tone while retaining plot elements.

== Plot ==
The Lester family resides in a place called Tobacco Road, located in Georgia. The family patriarch Jeeter lives with his wife Ada, his son Dude, and his single daughter Ellie May, but the Lesters are doomed to lose their land because the bank decides to take it over for more suitable farming. However, the bank is convinced by Capt. Tim Harmon (whose father had kept after the Lesters to grow crops) to potentially lease the land to Jeeter for $100 a year, provided he can get a loan. He plans to get a loan from the widow Sister Bessie Rice, who just received $800 from the life insurance company. However, Bessie decides to marry Dude and uses the money to buy a new car for Dude. Jeeter plans to find a way to get the money and also marry off Ellie May. His attempt at trying to sell Dude's car fails miserably, and it seems as though they will be forced to live in the poorhouse. It is Harmon who decides to give the Lesters a chance, lending them a stake for six months to try to grow a suitable crop, complete with $10 to get started.

== Cast ==
- Charley Grapewin as Lester
- Marjorie Rambeau as Sister Bessie
- Gene Tierney as Ellie May
- William Tracy as Dude Lester
- Elizabeth Patterson as Ada Lester
- Dana Andrews as Captain Tim
- Slim Summerville as Peabody
- Ward Bond as Lov Bensey
- Grant Mitchell as George Payne
- Zeffie Tilbury as Grandma
- Russell Simpson as Chief of Police
- Spencer Charters as County Clerk
- Irving Bacon as Teller
- Harry Tyler as Auto Dealer
- Charles Halton as Mayor
- George Chandler as Clerk

== Production ==
Studios attempted to acquire the screen rights to the novel from 1933. RKO Pictures and Warner Bros. considered buying the rights, the first intending to assign Charles Laughton in the lead role, but were discouraged from doing so. In March 1940, Columbia Pictures showed interest, but was informed that Tobacco Road was on the list of banned titles. Eventually, 20th Century Fox gained the rights in August 1940, with RKO as its main competitor. It was believed that Fox won due to the success of The Grapes of Wrath (1940). They were the main preference of the copyright holders Erskine Caldwell and Jack Kirkland, who were reluctant to sell the rights unless the story "would be picturized honestly and fearlessly."

Initially, Henry Hull was sought from Metro-Goldwyn-Mayer to reprise the main role previously portrayed on Broadway. However, in October 1940 he was revealed to be only in consideration, along with Walter Brennan and Henry Fonda.

Much to the "immense satisfaction of the studio", John Ford was signed on as the director as early as March 1940. On production, he commented in a December 1940 interview: "We have no dirt in the picture. We've eliminated the horrible details and what we've got left is a nice dramatic story. It's a tear-jerker, with some comedy relief. What we're aiming at is to have the customers sympathize with our people and not feel disgusted." The decision was most likely a result of a November 1940 warning that "many religious folk throughout the nation may be offended by the religious aspects."

Casting was a huge problem, and it was reported that producer Darryl F. Zanuck and director Ford deliberated for weeks. Marjorie Rambeau and Gene Tierney were cast in November 1940. Most other cast members were signed on in the same month. Ford personally insisted that Charley Grapewin be cast as Jeeter, because of their previous collaboration on The Grapes of Wrath. To portray Dude, William Tracy had to diet and lose teeth. On his role, Tracy commented in a December 1940 interview: "It's a swell part. It's one you can sink your teeth in, if you have your teeth."

While in production, Tobacco Road was thought to be received as even greater than The Grapes of Wrath. Filming was initially set on location in Georgia, but to avoid any controversy, the studio decided in November 1940 that the film would be shot in the studio on closed sets. To further prevent the film from being banned before its release, there was no publicity.

== Reception ==
It was one of Andrei Tarkovsky's favorite movies. Otar Iosseliani considered it a masterpiece.

Many critics compared the film of Tobacco Road to the stage version, which was still running on Broadway at the time of the film's release. Variety wrote, "The slightest attempt to clean up Jeeter and his brood dooms the effort to failure... He's better entertainment--and box office--with rough edges." Bosley Crowther of The New York Times described the film as a "leisurely picnic with a batch of moldy Georgia crackers."

Despite the studio's concerns over the censorship, the film was only banned in Australia. Although the film received mixed reviews, it became a success at the box office, and it had grossed up to $1.9 million by 1973.

== See also ==
- List of American films of 1941
- Southern Gothic
