= Frankie and Johnny =

Frankie and Johnny may refer to:

== Films ==
- Frankie and Johnny (1936 film), 1936 film co-starring Lilyan Tashman
- Frankie and Johnny (1966 film), a film starring Elvis Presley
- Frankie and Johnny (1991 film), a 1991 film based on Terrence McNally's play
- Frankie and Johnny Are Married, a 2003 comedy film about a troubled production of Terrence McNally's play

== Other ==
The story is discussed in:

- "Frankie and Johnny" (song), an American popular song
- Frankie and Johnny (ballet), a 1920s ballet choreographed by Ruth Page
- Frankie and Johnny (soundtrack), soundtrack for the Elvis Presley film
- Frankie and Johnny (1928 play), a 1928 play by Jack Kirkland
- Frankie and Johnny (1930 play), a 1930 play by John Huston
- Frankie and Johnny in the Clair de Lune, a 1987 play by Terrence McNally
