= Medicine Man (disambiguation) =

Medicine Man or The Medicine Man may refer to:

== Films ==
- The Medicine Man (1917 film), an American silent film directed by Clifford Smith
- The Medicine Man (1930 film), an American comedy film directed by Scott Pembroke
- The Medicine Man (1933 film), a British comedy film directed by Redd Davis
- Medicine Man (film), 1992 American romantic adventure

== Music ==
- "Medicine Man" (song), a 2015 song by Dr. Dre
- "Medicine Man", a song by Gwen Stefani from the soundtrack to the 2017 documentary film Served Like a Girl
- "Medicine Man", a song by Aldo Nova from the 1991 album Blood on the Bricks
- "Medicine Man", a song by Terry Cashman, Gene Pistilli, and Tommy West, aka Buchanan Brothers, from 1969
- "Medicine Man", a song by Bobby McFerrin from the 1990 album Medicine Music
- "Medicine Man", a song by Pantera from the 1990 album Cowboys from Hell
- "Medicine Man", a song by Riot from the 1993 album Nightbreaker
- "Medicine Man", an early version of the song "Rock! Rock! (Till You Drop)" by Def Leppard

== Other ==
- Medicine man (Native American), a traditional healer and spiritual leader among the indigenous people of the Americas
- "The Medicine Man" (story), a 1933 short story by Erskine Caldwell
- The Medicine Man (Dallin), an 1899 sculpture

== See also ==
- Mickey's Medicine Man, a 1934 short film starring Mickey Rooney
- The Medicine Men, an American music production team
- The Medicine Men (film), a 1938 American short
- "The Medicine Men" (The Avengers), a 1963 episode of the British television show
- Folk healer
