= Kneel to the Rising Sun =

Short story collection

First edition (publ. Viking Press)

Kneel to the Rising Sun is a collection of short stories by Erskine Caldwell first published in 1935. The seventeen stories, only a few pages each, all deal with various tragedies occurring in the early twentieth century American South, chiefly caused by poverty or racism. Caldwell is most well known for his novels, such as Tobacco Road; however, Kneel to the Rising Sun is held in high acclaim by his critics.

== Stories ==
- "Candy-Man Beechum"
- "The Walnut Hunt"
- "Horse Thief"
- "The Man Who Looked Like Himself"
- "Maud Island"
- "The Shooting"
- "Honeymoon"
- "Martha Jean"
- "A Day's Wooing"
- "The Cold Winter"
- "The Girl Ellen"
- "The Growing Season"
- "Daughter"
- "Blue Boy"
- "Slow Death"
- "Masses of Men"
- "Kneel to the Rising Sun"
