= God's Little Acre (film) =

1958 American film

- Directed by: Anthony Mann
- Screenplay by: Philip Yordan (front for Maddow); Ben Maddow (uncredited)
- Based on: the novel by Erskine Caldwell
- Produced by: Sidney Harmon
- Starring: Robert Ryan; Aldo Ray; Buddy Hackett; Jack Lord; Fay Spain; Vic Morrow; Tina Louise
- Cinematography: Ernest Haller A.S.C.
- Edited by: Richard C. Meyer
- Music by: Elmer Bernstein
- Production company: Security Pictures
- Distributed by: United Artists
- Release date: August 13, 1958
- Running time: 118 minutes
- Country: United States
- Language: English
- Box office: $3.5 million (US and Canada rentals)

God's Little Acre is a 1958 American comedy-drama film of Erskine Caldwell's 1933 novel of the same name. It was directed by Anthony Mann and shot in black and white by cinematographer Ernest Haller.

The film was as controversial as the novel, although unlike its source material it was not subjected to prosecution for obscenity. Although both the book and film were laced throughout with racy innuendo calling into question the issue of marital fidelity, the film adaptation may have been the more alarming because it portrayed a popular uprising, or workers' insurrection, in the Southern United States by laid-off millworkers trying to gain control of the factory equipment on which their jobs depended. When the film was first released, audiences under 18 years of age were prohibited from viewing what were perceived to be numerous sexy scenes throughout, although in recent decades the film's scandalous reputation has diminished.

Philip Yordan was officially given credit for the screenplay, but Ben Maddow claimed he wrote it. Since Maddow was blacklisted for his radical, and suspected but unproven, communist activities during the 1950s Red Scare, working without credit was the only way he could successfully submit screenplays. After decades of neglect, the film was restored by the UCLA Film and Television Archive under the supervision of master restorer Robert Gitt. As part of Gitt's restoration, Yordan's name was removed and replaced by Maddow's in the main titles, although it does not appear on most current releases.

== Plot ==
Widower Ty Ty Walden and three of his children—sons Buck and Shaw and daughter Darlin' Jill—live in the backwoods of Georgia. Buck's comely wife, Griselda, also lives with the family. Ty Ty's daughter, Rosamund, lives in the town of Peachtree Valley with her millworker husband, Will. The final member of the Walden family is estranged son Jim Leslie, also a widower, who is a wealthy cotton broker living in Augusta.

Ty Ty is a farmer who has been digging fruitlessly on his land for 15 years, searching for the treasure his grandfather left him. Consequently, the farm has suffered from years of neglect.

Pluto Swint arrives to announce he's running for sheriff. He comes around back, where Darlin' Jill is taking a bath in an outdoor bathtub positioned near a handpump and spigot. Knowing Swint is attracted to her, she teases him and asks him to pump some more water. Although Swint keeps his eyes closed, he sneaks a peek.

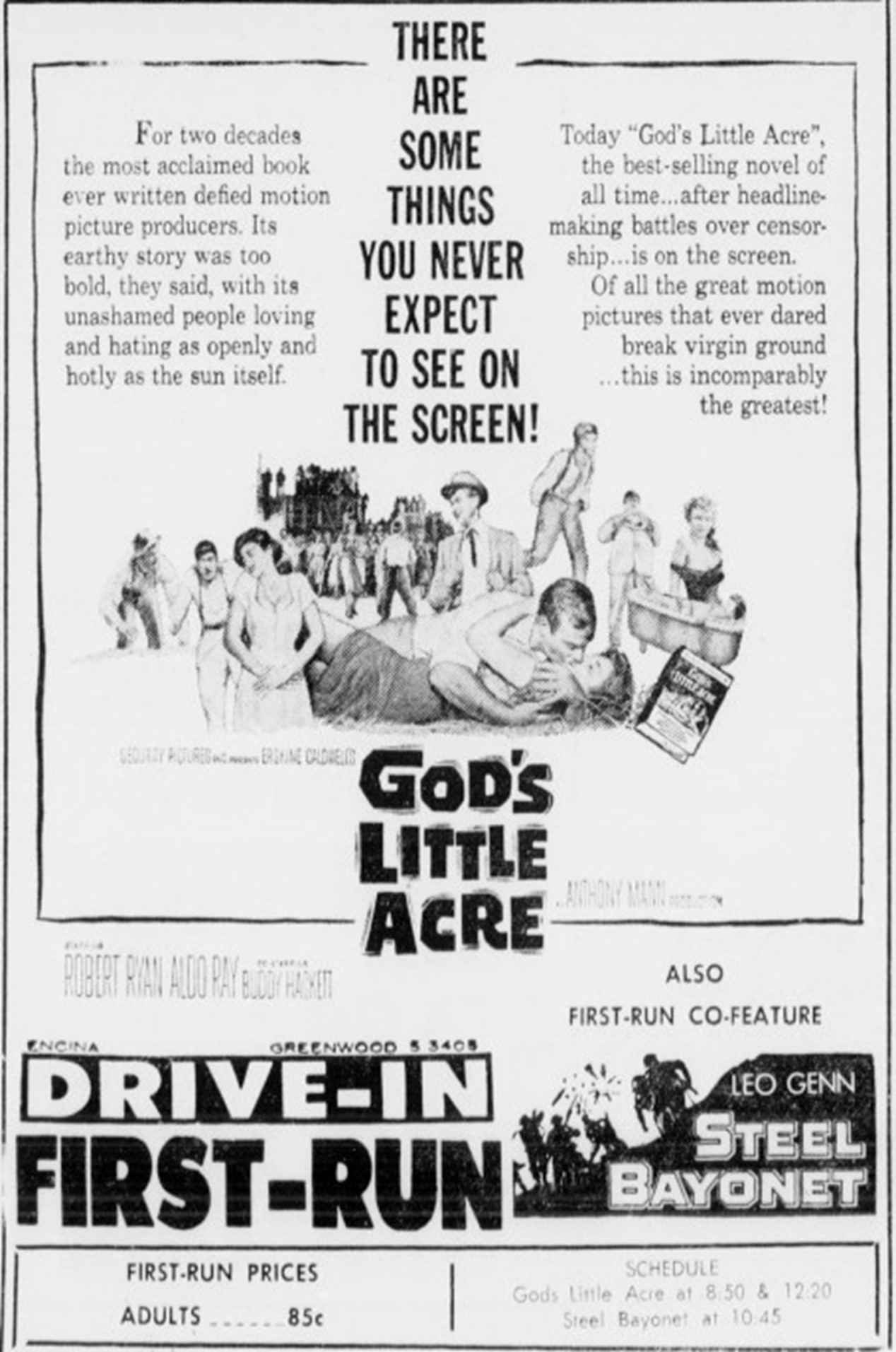
Drive-in advertisement from 1958 for God's Little Acre and co-feature, The Steel Bayonet.

In the belief that having a person with albinism accompany him on his quest for treasure will bring him luck, Ty Ty kidnaps an albino, Dave Dawson, demanding that he help locate the buried treasure. Dawson, using a divining rod, claims the gold lies on the parcel of land Ty Ty has designated as "God's Little Acre." Ty Ty pulls the cross marker out of the ground, explaining that God told him to move it, thereby absolving him from giving any gold found in this new spot to the church. Darlin' Jill seduces Dawson one night, and the next day, a field worker, Uncle Felix, chases him away at gunpoint, saying, "I ain't going to shoot you, son, but this gun might."

The digging-for-gold project has interrupted farming, and Ty Ty needs money to feed the family and workers. At Felix's suggestion, he goes to his son Jim Leslie's mansion to ask for a loan. An arrogant Jim Leslie gives him the money, but he also makes a pass at his sister-in-law, Griselda, and vows to make her his own.

In Peachtree Valley, the cotton mill has been closed for months, causing considerable tension among the unemployed men. Will is determined to break into the mill and turn on the electricity so everyone can get back to work. In the middle of the night, after drinking heavily, Will leaves his house. Rosamund sends Griselda after him because she knows Will is attracted to her. He breaks open the mill's gates and enters the property. At first, Griselda distracts him from his purpose. They kiss passionately and then disappear into another room. When they emerge with disheveled hair, he escorts her back to the gates and asks the growing crowd to restrain her. He re-enters and turns on the power, and the machines reactivate to the cheers of the crowd.

The caretaker, hearing the rioters' assembly and the mill's power turned on, comes from an inside office and shoots Will for trespassing. The crowd carries his body back to his house. Griselda enters to tell Rosamund the bad news, but Rosamund cries out that she already knows what has happened.

Back at the farm, the Walden family squabbles after Will's funeral, notably Buck, who is angry over Griselda's behavior with Will at the mill. Ty Ty encourages Buck to be happier and to spend more time thinking about God. Jim Leslie arrives to steal Griselda, and Buck fights him. During the fight, Jim Leslie hits Ty Ty in the head with a porch rung. Realizing that his elusiveness has torn the family apart, he jumps between his sons before Buck impales Jim Lesile with a pitchfork and sends Jim Leslie away to prevent further violence. Ty Ty gazes upon his farmland, filled with the massive holes dug over the past 15 years, and declares that he will stop digging for gold if God will protect his sons.

Time passes. Pluto Swint, now elected sheriff, shows off his uniform to Darlin' Jill, now his fiancée. Buck and Griselda have made amends, giving one another more attention. The family contentedly plows the fields for the first time in years, and it looks like they might finally produce a crop. But Ty Ty finds the blade of an old shovel in the ground and speculates about whether the gold might lie in that spot. As he begins digging again, the final scene pans to the final resting place of the marker for God's Little Acre—the pond.

== Cast ==
- Robert Ryan as Ty Ty Walden, a widower
- Aldo Ray as Will Thompson, his son-in-law
- Buddy Hackett as Pluto Swint
- Jack Lord as Buck Walden, his son
- Fay Spain as Darlin' Jill Walden, his daughter
- Vic Morrow as Shaw Walden, his son
- Helen Westcott as Rosamund, Ty Ty's daughter and Will's wife

- Lance Fuller as Jim Leslie Walden, his son
- Rex Ingram as Uncle Felix
- Michael Landon as Dave Dawson, the albino
- Russell Collins as watchman
- Davis Roberts as farm worker with hoe
- Janet Brandt [also listed in credits as dialogue coach] as an angry woman
- Tina Louise as Griselda Walden, Buck's wife

== Production ==
Anthony Mann said "Everyone said it wasn’t possible to make a film from this Caldwell book - and if you read it, it’s about the kookiest book you’ve ever seen. It was a challenge to try and find the spirit behind the book and behind these miserable characters. It became another experiment and was entirely another kind of picture, I rehearsed with the actors, for the first time, for about three weeks before we started shooting, so that they would all know the characters and would all know each other and become a family, react properly. This became more of a group sort of thing, more theatre than I usually do."

Filming took place in Stockton, California.

== See also ==
- Hell's Half Acre (1954 film)
