= Warm River =

Warm River may refer to:

- Warm River, Idaho, a city in the United States
- "Warm River" (story), by Erskine Caldwell, 1933
