= Indian Summer (story) =

1932 short story by Erskine Caldwell

"Indian Summer" is a short story by Erskine Caldwell, dealing with adolescence in the Southern countryside and an early, ambivalent sexual experience.

It was originally published in 1932 and included in We Are the Living (1933). It was also included in the 1983 collection of Caldwell stories, Stories of Life North & South.. In 1989 Story magazine chose it for re-publication as "a classic story"..

== Plot synopsis ==
Two adolescent boys—Jack, the narrator, and his friend Les—take off their clothes to go bathing in a creek recently filled by the rains. The creek is not the best place for the purpose—the waters are yellow, the floor is made of ankle-deep stinking muck and it is also full of dead tree limbs, some of them very sharp on bare feet. But it is all that the boys have.

The two accuse Old Howes, a farmer whose land is nearby, of deliberately filling the creek with tree limbs in order to keep them away, since they are scaring his cows. (It is revealed that at some past time they did put a drake in his chicken run.)

Suddenly, they hear steps. The newcomer turns out to be Jenny, Howes' daughter who is a year or two older than them and for whom they bear a grudge for having "told tales" and gotten them punished. The boys tell her to go away and after a short and angry altercation she takes their clothes and threatens to hide them where they will never be found.

The boys thereupon get out of the water, chase Jenny and drag her back to the edge of the creek. Les suggests dunking her. Jack, however, recalls that when they did it to a coloured boy named Bisco they came close to drowning him, and suggests to mud-cake Jenny instead. Les takes the suggestion but says that for that purpose they should strip Jenny naked.

Despite Jenny fiercely resisting and kicking Jack very painfully in the stomach, they manage to get her clothes off and proceed to cover her with stinking mud. Jack however takes care not to put mud on her hair, knowing from experience that it would be very difficult to get off. He also takes care to hang her dress on a bush, to prevent it from becoming dirty.

Overtly, the two boys do not think of their acts as sexual, but as a wild "horseplay" which might have been inflicted also on another boy. However, Jack becomes aware of the softness of Jenny's breasts, and sees her looking at him—which makes him start feeling that they are doing is "a mean thing". He resists the impulse to touch her breasts again and convinces Les to let her go.

Now feeling shy, the boys go behind bushes to dress, though Jenny already saw them naked. For her part she quickly washes off the mud and gets dressed. Les immediately goes away, but Jack lingers, feeling apprehensive of the punishment awaiting him once Jenny tells of what he and Les had done to her.

Jenny, however, is less hostile than he expected, and though he feels awkward and tends to run away from her, she actually invites him to walk with her to her home. Hesitantly he says: "But you're going to tell, aren't you? Aren't you going to tell what we did to you?" Jenny does not answer, but before going into her home she briefly touches his hand and afterwards gives him a look over her shoulder from the door. The story ends with Jack going back to his own home, saying to himself over and over again: "Jenny won't tell, Jenny won't tell."

== Critical opinion ==
Critic Phil Thomas characterizes "Indian Summer"—along with another Caldwell story, "The Automobile that Wouldn't Run"—as stories which "bubble over with tenderness and gentle humor".
