= The People's Choice (short story) =

1932 short story by Erskine Caldwell

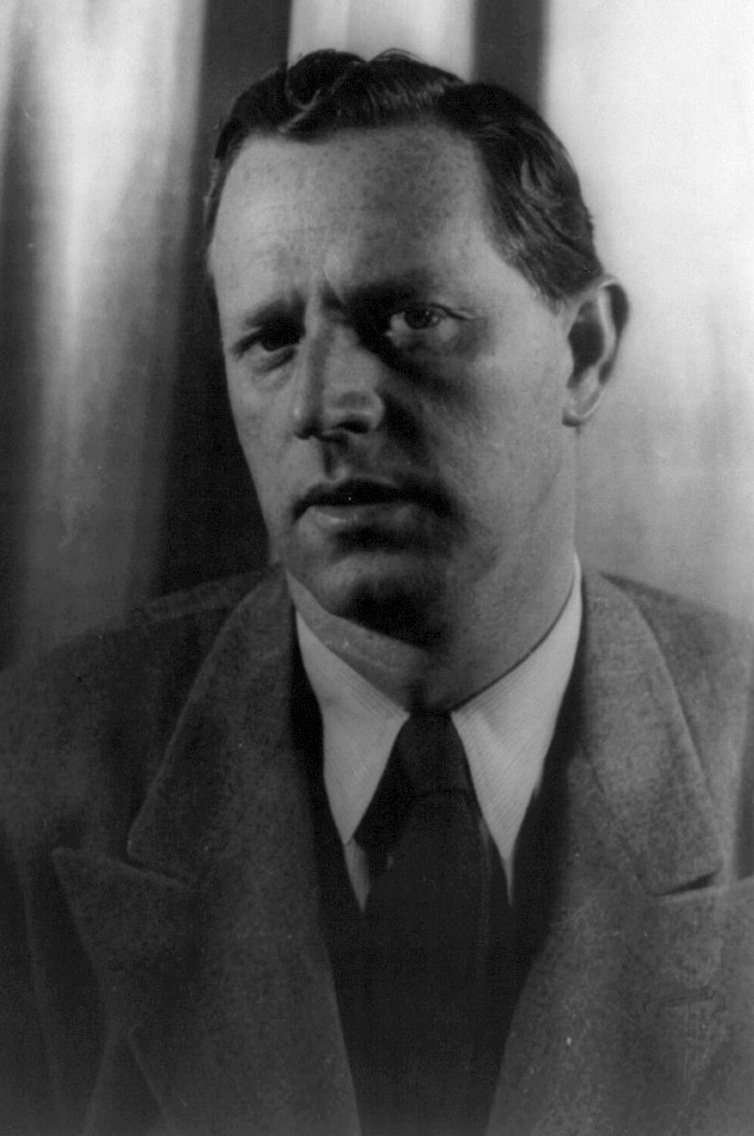
Erskine Caldwell in 1938

"The People's Choice" is a short story by Erskine Caldwell, a satire on 1930s local politics and religion in the writer's home state of Georgia and by extension on those topics in general.

It was originally published in 1932 and included in We Are the Living (1933).

== Plot synopsis ==
Gus Streetman is a local politician in Washington County, Georgia, who has held the position of the county's tax assessor for fifteen years already and is virtually certain to get re-elected however many times he chose. He is an extremely popular man, always ready to do favors to his very numerous friends, ready on occasion to lend his car and even to lend his wife (though the last turned out to be a joke...).

On the eve of the Democratic Party White primaries each four years, he is in the habit of conducting a very personal kind of canvassing, vising the homes of voters and treating his constituents to generous helpings of Senator Watson watermelons, and always wins the Democratic nomination by a big margin. As the county – like the South generally at this time – is virtually a one-party system, the whites-only Democratic primaries are the effective true elections; the heavily outnumbered Republicans don't even bother to take part in the local general elections.

Streetman is a heavy drinker of corn and gin, of which he keeps stashes at his home, at the barber shop where he spends much of his time and at his office in the local courthouse. He is not bothered with the fact that under Prohibition this is an illegal act. He starts drinking early in the day and goes on, but is well able to hold his drink and walk straight without showing a sign of being drunk, and therefore the local marshal was never obliged to lock him up - though his habits are well known to the entire town.

At the time of the story, Streetman resolves to be elected also as a deacon in the local church, making an effective use of his "watermelon canvassing" on the Minister and Elders and being unanimously elected. One of the Elders makes the mistake of giving Streetman the happy news already on Saturday morning instead of waiting until just before the Sunday service - thereby giving the new deacon twenty four hours to celebrate by getting very thoroughly drunk.

Streetman locks himself up in his office at the courthouse and embarks on a particularly heavy drinking binge, as is his habit every time he wins an election. In the evening he emerges and goes to a traveling carnival visiting the town, taking in all the side shows with a big crowd of men and boys following him around the grounds, "whooping it up with him".

Noticing around midnight a tent featuring the sexually provocative performance of a "hoochie coochie girl", Streetman buys several dozen tickets and invites everybody to join him. But once inside, the drunken Streetman lunges at the near-naked dancer and knocks down the tent pole. His friends disentangle him with difficulty from the furiously fighting girl, and take him to the back room of the barber shop before the marshal's arrival on the scene. However, he finds the bottles he had hidden there and spends the rest of the night with further heavy drinking.

In the morning, his friends take him to church, and though the night events have already become well known in the town's gossip, he at first makes a somewhat presentable appearance as the new deacon. Though "drunk as a horse-trader on court-day" he walks straight down the aisle, rattling the collection basket. However, when a girl singer starts making the solo in the choir, she reminds him of the hoochie coochie girl and he starts shouting "Shake it up! Shake it up, baby!", with the liquor fumes from his mouth invading the whole of the church.

The Minister and Elders have no choice but to hurriedly wind up the service and bundle Streetman off to the town's lock up. However, the building is closed and the marshal has to be called from his home with the keys. Streetman uses the time to get on the radiator of an automobile and make an impassioned speech: "Citizens of Washington County, I'm here today to ask if you if you think there's another man in the entire county who can increase the membership and attendance and double the collection in a church, like the man you are now facing!" and is answered by wild cheers from the crowd. When finally locked up he still makes another rousing speech out of the barred window.

The end of the story makes clear that Streetman's political career was in no way harmed by this scandal, nor did he lose his position as a deacon in the Church...
