= Howard Brockway =

American classical composer

Howard A. Brockway (November 22, 1870 – February 20, 1951) was an American composer.

Brockway was born on November 22, 1870, in Brooklyn, New York. He spent five years in Berlin, studying composition under Otis Bardwell Boise and piano under Heinrich Barth. Afterwards he returned to the U.S. and worked as a piano teacher and composer at the Peabody Institute in Baltimore, Maryland, along with the Institute of Musical Art (now the Juilliard School) and the Mannes College of Music, both in New York. Some of his pupils included Eugene Bonner, Eva Clare, Dorothy Priesing, and Anne Stratton.

Collaborating with the classically-trained singer Loraine Wyman, he carried out a six-week fieldwork journey in the Appalachian Mountains in Kentucky to collect traditional folk songs from the people living there. Brockway recorded the tunes (and later wrote piano accompaniments), while Wyman recorded the words. They published their work in two volumes, which appeared in 1916 and 1920.

Brockway’s own compositions include a symphony, a suite, a symphonic ballad, a piano concerto, chamber-music works, choirs, and songs. He died on February 20, 1951, in New York.

From around 1911 to 1920, Brockway worked for the American Piano Corporation (Ampico) as a recording artist and piano roll editor. He recorded at least 155 works for the classical catalogue, and also numerous accompaniment and popular items. He was Ampico's most prolific artist. The 1925 Catalogue of Ampico Music states: "His interpretations of selections from the operas are of particular importance, as he has made a special study of that form of musical expression, and his illustrated lectures on this subject are well known." He recorded under a number of pseudonyms including Al Sterling and Andrei Kmita. The 1921 QRS Artecho listing of reproducing piano rolls shows Brockway as recording 22 works.

== Specific works ==
- Sonata, for violin and piano, op. 9, (ed. Robert Lienau), 1894
- Symphony in D, op. 12
- Cavatina, for violin and chamber orchestra, op. 13 (ed. Robert Lienau), 1895
- Romanza, for violin and piano, op. 19 (ed. Robert Lienau), 1897
- Suite of Small Pieces, for pianoforte, op.26 (ed. G. Schirmer), 1901
1. Idyl
2. Étude
3. Scherzo
4. Evening Song
5. Humoresque
6. March
- Piano Quintet

- Suite, for cello and orchestra, op. 35 (ed. John Church Co.), 1908
1. Allegro con brio
2. Ballade
3. Serenade au carnavale
4. Allegro molto agitato
