= We Are Looking at You, Agnes =

1931 short story by Erskine Caldwell

"We Are Looking at You, Agnes" is short story by Erskine Caldwell, originally published 1931, included in We Are the Living (1933).

The entire story is told as a single interior monologue of the protagonist, a young woman named Agnes.

From the way that her family members (father, mother, brother and sister) look at her, Agnes is sure that they know her guilty secret—but never talk about it. As the reader learns, five years before Agnes was sent to Birmingham, Alabama in order to study stenography at a business school, for which purpose her father gave her fifty dollars. Instead, however, she went to a "beauty-culture school" and learned to be a manicurist.

Afterwards, Agnes worked as a manicurist in a series of barber shops at Birmingham, Nashville, Memphis and finally on Canal Street, New Orleans—each of a lesser quality than the earlier. In each she found herself wanted for purposes other than as a manicurist, by men who "put their hands down the neck of my dress and squeezed until I screamed" and who afterwards talked to her about things which she "never heard of at home".

After some time, finding that she was "making more money on the outside than at the [manicuring] table", Agnes left the barber shop altogether and went to live in "a cheap hotel".

Agnes is still coming every year to spend Christmas with her family. From the way that they look at her, and from the fact that they never ask any questions about her supposed work as a stenographer in Birmingham, she feels sure that they know how she actually earns her living – but they never speak of it. She in fact desperately hopes that they would, whereupon she would tell the truth and then she won't have to come again in the following years for visits which have plainly become an ordeal. But they never do speak up, and neither does Agnes herself.

Near the end, the reader learns that Agnes' parents regard her as literally "unclean": Whenever she leaves the room, her father wipes the chair she sat on with a cloth soaked in alcohol, and after meals her mother takes the dishes she had used and scalds them in the sink.

Still, the parents and siblings never speak up, and the story ends as it began: with the others sitting at the other side of the parlor and looking at Agnes, silently and accusingly.
