= The Medicine Man (story) =

1933 short story by Erskine Caldwell

"The Medicine Man" is a humorous short story by Erskine Caldwell. It was included in We Are the Living (1933). It was also included in the Stories of Erskine Caldwell, a collection of 96 stories first published in 1953 and re-issued in 1996 by the University of Georgia Press.

== Plot synopsis ==
The story begins with the statement: "There was nobody in Rawley who believed that Effie Henderson would ever find a man to marry her, and Effie herself had just about given up hope. But that was before the traveling herb doctor came to town."

There follows a description of the arrival of Professor Eaton, who comes to this town, as he has to countless others, to sell green bottles of Indian Root Tonic, touted as a panacea, "the one and only cure for all ailments," whose secret he claims to have been bequeathed at the deathbed of a western Indian chief. Townspeople crowd around to buy the bottles, sold for a dollar each (members of Rawley's Black community stand aside, frustrated and envious, as they can't afford to pay that price).

Effie Henderson appears on the evening of the Professor's arrival, buys a bottle, and comes back the following morning to buy a second one, calling from the crowd to the Professor that the first bottle has done her great good. At first he takes her for a middle-aged matron and replies to her overtures with what are clearly his standard words of praise, prepared for all female customers; he then begins to truly look at her for the first time, and he and the reader learn that Effie is only about thirty and of at least average looks. The Professor thereupon becomes increasingly interested in Effie, and fixes his gaze on her bosom. She appears completely gullible, taking at face value the excessive compliments he showers on her. Soon, he gives her the second bottle free and proceeds to close down his stall for the afternoon (it has grown quite hot outside and few new customers are arriving), gallantly offering to escort her home.

On entering her home, Effie lets the Professor conclude that she lives alone, whereupon he proceeds to persuade her to undress on the pretext of "a medical examination." A bit flustered, Effie consents. But once she is naked, the door suddenly opens and her brother Burke, the town's marshal, comes in. This comes as a surprise to the Professor as well as the reader since Burke's existence had not been mentioned previously. Discovering his sister in this compromising position, Burke places his hand on the pearl handle of his gun and angrily demands to know the Professor's intentions. It is Effie who answers that the Professor intends to marry her – and he, having plainly intended nothing but casual sex, has no choice but to assent.

Though it is not explicitly stated, the ending gives the clear impression of a deliberate badger game planned in advance by brother and sister in order to get Effie a husband.

== Critical opinion ==
"'The Medicine Man' is a first-rate sample of what some people have called [Caldwell's] Rabelaisian humor, although it is really pornography with a horse laugh." (Carl Bode, "Erskine Caldwell: A Note for the Negative" (JSTOR 372379)

== See also ==
- Patent medicine
