= We Are the Living =

1933 collection of short stories by Erskine Caldwell

- First edition
- Author: Erskine Caldwell
- Language: English
- Published: 1933
- Publisher: Viking Press
- Publication place: USA

We Are the Living is a 1933 collection of short stories by Erskine Caldwell, comprising some of his earlier works.

== Background ==
Viking Press published the collection in September 1933. Sixteen of its twenty stories had been previously published in various magazines, while four—"The Medicine Man," "Meddlesome Jack," "The Grass Fire," and "A Woman in the House"—were new.

Some stories in the collection are humorous or satirical, while others are lyrical, romantic and/or tragic. Several of them are laid against the background of the lives of ordinary people in the contemporary US South, the social milieu most familiar to the author; some are specifically located in his home state of Georgia.

== Contents ==
The stories in the book include:

- "Warm River"
- "We Are Looking at You, Agnes"
- "The People's Choice"
- "Indian Summer"
- "Rachel"
- "The Medicine Man"
- "Picking Cotton"
- "Meddlesome Jack"
- "The Picture"
- "Yellow Girl"
- "August Afternoon"
- "Mama's Little Girl"
- "The First Autumn"
- "After-Image"
- "Crown-Fire"
- "The Empty Room"
- "Over the Green Mountains"
- "The Grass Fire"
- "A Woman in the House"
- "Country Full of Swedes"

== Critical reception ==
Biographer Wayne Mixon wrote that We are the Living largely "went unnoticed in the southern press." Mixon suggests that the inclusion of "August Afternoon"—a story about a lazy white farmer, a drifter who seduces the farmer's wife, and his Black field hand who refuses Vic's order to accost him—was to blame.

TIME magazine, reviewing the collection in 1933, highlighted Caldwell's more bawdy, humorous stories as standouts. Of those, they wrote: "Mark Twain would have roared over [these stories] -- in private."
