= Anne Stratton =

American composer (1887–1977)

Anne Gannet Stratton Miller Holden (April 17, 1887 – October 1, 1977) was an American composer who is best remembered today for her song “Boats of Mine,” which was widely performed and recorded during her lifetime. She published her music under the name Anne Stratton.

Stratton was born in Cleburne, Texas, to Mary Louise Baker and William H. Stratton. She married Robert Gardner Miller in 1909, then married Thomas Steele Holden in 1922. She and Holden had one son.

Stratton studied music at the University of Texas and the Damrosch Conservatory (today the Juilliard School) with Howard Brockway and Etta Wilson. She was a member of Kappa Kappa Gamma and the American Society of Composers, Authors and Publishers (ASCAP).

In addition to composing, Stratton recorded music for piano rolls. Her songs were published by Harold Flammer (today Shawnee Press/Hal Leonard) and the Boston Music Company. They included:

- “Ah, Love, How Soon?”
- “Boats of Mine” (text by Robert Louis Stevenson)
- “Dusk Comes Floating By”
- “From Out the Long Ago”
- “Home Time”
- “May Magic”
- “My Goal”
- “November”
- “Parting at Morning” (text by Robert Browning)
- “Plantation Ditty” (text by Ruth McEnery Stuart)
- “Sun of My Soul”
- “The Sun at Last”
- “Wash Day”
