= Warm River (story) =

1933 short love story by Erskine Caldwell

"Warm River" is short love story by Erskine Caldwell, included in the collection We Are the Living (1933). It was selected as one of the Best Short Stories of 1932. It is one of the most frequently reprinted of Caldwell's stories.

== Plot synopsis ==
Richard, the protagonist, crosses in the night a dangerous footbridge in the mountains and arrives at a house where a girl named Gretchen is eagerly waiting for him. She introduces him to her father and her two younger sisters. As gradually becomes clear, Richard's original intention in coming there was to have casual sex with Gretchen and go away in the morning, possibly never to see her again.

Hearing Gretchen's father talk of how he never got over the death of his wife, Gretchen's mother, Richard becomes ashamed of his intention to have sex with a girl who loves him deeply when he can't give her real love in return. Therefore, he declines Gretchen's invitation to kiss her, goes chastely to his room and asks her to wake him up in time catch his train in the morning.

Unable to sleep, however, Richard changes his mind again, gets up and goes to Gretchen's room. Opening the door quietly, he sees Gretchen kneeling near her bed, praying and crying. Intent on her prayer, she does not notice him. Seeing her thus, Richard realises that he does love her. He therefore goes silently back to his room, and when she comes in the morning he tells her "I don't need to catch the train. I am not going away unless you come with me."
