= Hello, Everybody! =

1933 film directed by William A. Seiter

- Theatrical release poster
- Directed by: William A. Seiter
- Screenplay by: Lawrence Hazard; Fannie Hurst; Dorothy Yost
- Produced by: William LeBaron
- Starring: Kate Smith; Randolph Scott; Sally Blane; Charley Grapewin; George Barbier; Wade Boteler; Julia Swayne Gordon
- Cinematography: Gilbert Warrenton
- Edited by: James Smith
- Production company: Paramount Pictures
- Distributed by: Paramount Pictures
- Release date: February 17, 1933
- Running time: 69 minutes
- Country: United States
- Language: English
- Budget: $2 million

Hello, Everybody! is a 1933 American pre-Code musical film directed by William A. Seiter and written by Lawrence Hazard, Fannie Hurst, and Dorothy Yost. The film stars Kate Smith, Randolph Scott, Sally Blane, Charley Grapewin, George Barbier, Wade Boteler and Julia Swayne Gordon. The film was released on February 17, 1933, by Paramount Pictures.

== Plot ==
The setting is a farm. Kate Smith and Sally Blane play sisters; assorted relatives live with the sisters, but everyone at home, and in the whole town, depends on Kate to hold everything together. The power company wants to build a dam which will require flooding many of the farms; Kate is holding out; if Kate sells, everyone else will sell; if Kate refuses, the rest of the town will refuse as well. Randolph Scott meets Kate's beautiful sister, Sally Blane, at a dance. Randolph Scott, as it turns out, is an agent for the power company. Kate thinks he's just using Sally; Sally believes that he truly likes her. Randolph comes to the farm and appears to woo Kate. Kate remains unconvinced about selling out, but falls for Randolph.

== Cast ==
- Kate Smith as Kate Smith
- Randolph Scott as Hunt Blake
- Sally Blane as Lily Smith
- Charley Grapewin as Jed
- George Barbier as Mr. Blair
- Wade Boteler as Parker
- Julia Swayne Gordon as Mrs. Smith
- Erville Alderson as Horton
- William B. Davidson as Mr. Parker
- Paul Kruger as Mr. Lindle
- Ted Collins as Ted Collins
- Frank Darien as Henry Thompson
- Fern Emmett as Ettie
- Jerry Tucker as Bobby Smith
- Marguerite Campbell as Bettina Smith
- Edwards Davis as Sinclair Eldridge
- Frank McGlynn, Sr. as Jonathan Reed
- Hallene Hill as Mrs. Thompson
- Lon Poff as Constable

== Production ==
The film cost over $2 million to make.

== Works cited ==
- Medved, Harry; Medved, Michael (1984). The Hollywood Hall of Shame: The Most Expensive Flops in Movie History. Angus & Robertson. ISBN 0207149291.
