= Frankie and Johnny (play) =

1926 play by Jack Kirkland

Frankie and Johnnie
- Original language: English
- Written by: Jack Kirkland
- Based on: Frankie and Johnny
- Music by: Eugene Bonner
- Subject: Romantic triangle
- Genre: Melodrama
- Setting: Danny's Alton House, St. Louis, 1849

Premiere
- Date: September 25, 1930
- Place: Theatre Republic
- Directed by: John D. Williams (1929); Lee Elmore (1930)

Frankie and Johnnie is a 1926 play by Jack Kirkland, based on the popular American ballad. It has three acts, one setting, and a large cast. The story concerns a dance hall girl whose lover is lured away by another woman, leading to tragedy. The setting is in a St. Louis waterfront dance hall during 1849.

A. H. Woods acquired the rights to produce Frankie and Johnnie in the Spring of 1929. John D. Williams staged it, Eugene Bonner provided incidental music, and the sets were by P. Dodd Ackerman. A tryout was held at New Rochelle, New York in May 1929, with Grace Kern, Louis Heydt, and Leona Maricle as the principals. The production then moved to Chicago, where after two weeks it was shut down by the Police Commissioner.

The play remained dormant until John Morfit agreed to mount a new production, staged by Lee Elmore, with a tryout in Queens during September 1930. The principals were Ann Forrest, Frank McGlynn, Jr. and Roberta Beatty. The tryout lasted two days before it was closed down and the cast members arrested. However, a "toned-down" version of the play went ahead on Broadway at the Theatre Republic later that month, running through November 1930. The playwright, director, stage manager, and principal cast members were found guilty at a trial, and given suspended sentences.

The play was adapted for a 1936 movie of the same name.

== Characters ==
Lead

- Frankie is the queen of Danny's dance hall girls, who falls in love with Johnnie.
- Johnnie is a riverboat gambler with country charm who has just arrived in St. Louis.
- Nellie Bly is another of Danny's dance hall girls, with an eye on Johnnie's bank roll.

Other principal roles

- The Count is the piano player in Danny's Alton House, who plays and sings the ballad.
- Danny owns the dance hall where both Frankie and Nellie Bly work.
- Lazy Ike
- Lady Lou
- Jimmie the Waiter
- A Fancy Man
- Pansy
- Lily
- Honest John Walsh
- Margy the Dove, likely soiled. This character was dropped after the Chicago closing.

Bit Players

- Dance Hall girls, gamblers, waiters

== Synopsis ==
The play takes place at Danny's Alton House, a waterfront establishment offering dubious and dangerous pursuits, in St. Louis during 1849. Frankie is the belle of Danny's dance hall girls. Among the accessories of her trade is a .44 revolver, which she is adept at using. Johnnie is a fresh-faced young man who looks like a simple backswoodsman, but who makes his living on riverboats as a card sharp. He arrives at Danny's Alton House fresh from the riverboat Natchez, with a $13,000 bankroll won from cotton barons. He and Frankie become lovers; she sees in him the chance to escape the waterfront and go west to California. But Nellie Bly, another dance hall girl at Danny's, aims to lure Johnnie into her arms, both to get his bankroll and to spite Frankie. Nellie's enticements win; Johnnie spends generously on her, while pretending to Frankie he has lost his money. Frankie sets out to earn him more money by plying her vocation. Their friends see what is happening, and the Count makes up a song about it. Frankie finds out about Johnnie's treachery, and gives him one last gift: three rounds from her revolver. The sheriff is obliged to arrest Frankie for homicide, and she is tried and condemned. The play never resolves Johnnie's character: whether he was a sophisticate aware of the danger in betraying Frankie, or just a simple frontiersman trying to please both girls.

== Original production ==
=== Background ===
Jack Kirkland was a St. Louis native who knew of the local Black community's tradition about the popular ballad. He was a journalist working at the New York Daily News when he met and married chorus girl Nancy Carroll in 1924. He was still writing under his own byline for the Daily News in January 1926, but by July he had been signed as a scenario writer for First National Pictures.

Kirkland started writing the play in August 1926, but wasn't able to find a producer for it. Al Woods had backed several risque productions among his many mainstream works. He was willing to take a chance on Frankie and Johnnie, and started casting it in April 1929. Woods hired John D. Williams to direct for a summer engagement in Chicago.

=== Cast ===
Principal cast only during the 1929 New Rochelle tryout and the Chicago run.
Role	Actor	Dates	Notes and sources
Frankie	Grace Kern	May 23, 1929 - Jun 12, 1929	Not to be confused with Grace Kerns, this actress was from Pennsylvania. (Note: She was born in Northampton, Pennsylvania and studied dramatics at Cedar Crest College in Allentown, Pennsylvania. She had previously worked for A. H. Woods as a replacement lead in The Trial of Mary Dugan.)
Johnnie	Louis Heydt	May 23, 1929 - Jun 12, 1929	
Nellie Bly	Leona Maricle	May 23, 1929 - Jun 12, 1929	Maricle and Heydt had been married since August 1928.
The Count	Kenneth Burton	May 23, 1929 - Jun 12, 1929	
Danny	Edgar Nelson	May 23, 1929 - Jun 12, 1929	
Lazy Ike	Charles Henderson	May 23, 1929 - Jun 12, 1929	
Lady Lou	Georgie Drew Mendum	May 23, 1929 - Jun 12, 1929	
Jimmie	Ralph Wordley	May 23, 1929 - Jun 12, 1929	
A Fancy Man	Ray Earles	May 23, 1929 - Jun 12, 1929	
Lily	Grace Peters	May 23, 1929 - Jun 12, 1929	
Pansy	Helene Sinnott	May 23, 1929 - Jun 12, 1929	
John Walsh	Preston Sturges	May 23, 1929 - Jun 12, 1929	Why Sturges was in this ill-fated production is unknown, but his presence is well attested.
Margy	Mary Brett	May 23, 1929 - Jun 12, 1929	

Principal cast only during the 1930 Queens tryout and the Broadway run. The production was on hiatus from September 11 through September 25, 1930.
Role	Actor	Dates	Notes and sources
Frankie	Anne Forrest	Sep 08, 1930 - Oct 04, 1930	Forrest missed the second tryout night, her place being taken by Josephine Evans, who was arrested.
Frankie	Helen MacKellar	Oct 06, 1930 - Nov 15, 1930	MacKellar must have had the producers over a barrel for she received top billing.
Johnnie	Frank McGlynn, Jr.	Sep 08, 1930 - Nov 15, 1930	
Nellie Bly	Roberta Beatty	Sep 08, 1930 - Nov 15, 1930	
The Count	Kenneth Burton	Sep 08, 1930 - Nov 15, 1930	Burton was the only cast member retained from the 1929 production.
Danny	Arthur Griffin	Sep 08, 1930 - Nov 15, 1930	
Lazy Ike	Jerome Cowan	Sep 08, 1930 - Nov 15, 1930	
Lady Lou	Valerie Valaire	Sep 08, 1930 - Nov 15, 1930	
Jimmie	Cliff Heckinger	Sep 09, 1930 - Nov 15, 1930	
A Fancy Man	Manuel Duarte	Sep 08, 1930 - Nov 15, 1930	
Lily	Regina Valdy	Sep 08, 1930 - Nov 15, 1930	
Pansy	Josephine Evans	Sep 08, 1930 - Nov 15, 1930	
John Walsh	Will T. Chatterton	Sep 08, 1930 - Nov 15, 1930	

=== 1929 production ===
A. H. Woods announced a first tryout at Hempstead, New York, but within a week it was switched to New Rochelle, New York. The two-day tryout opened at the New Rochelle Theatre (Note: This was located at Main and Rose Streets.) on May 23, 1929. John D. Williams directed, Eugene Bonner provided incidental music, and costumes were by Mrs. Sydney Harris. Sets were designed by P. Dodd Ackerman.

The production then went to the Adelphi Theatre in Chicago, owned by Woods, opening on May 26, 1929. The reviewer for the Chicago Tribune said: "Chicago... would have been just as well off without Frankie and Johnnie. Its pretty terrible." They condemned the play as "filth", saying Diamond Lil with Mae West by comparison was "chaste". They also noted that while sets and costumes were period specific, the dialogue ran to more modern language.

Despite, or perhaps because of the review, the play continued until an ill-informed alderman took his family to view it. The City Censor, Col. Philip R. Crippen, sent an investigator, and afterwards pronounced it as "raw". The Commissioner of Police William T. Russell said on June 12, 1929, the cast would be arrested if the play was performed that evening. A compromise was reached allowing the matinee performance for June 12 to proceed, with Woods' representative Ralph Kettering dropping a stay order on the shutdown. That night, crowds swarmed the box office in vain seeking tickets; the show was closed.

Shortly after the closing, lead actress Grace Kern secretly married the company manager Charles Wendling, the brother of Claudette Colbert.

=== 1930 tryout ===
Jack Kirkland found a new backer for his play in John Morfit. Although credited in some newspapers, others had Kirkland as presenting the play. Kirkland had booked the independently owned Brandt's Carlton-Jamaica Theatre in Queens for a week-long tryout, starting September 8, 1930. A local reviewer spent most of their column listing the notables at the opening, foremost of whom was Kirkland's wife Nancy Carroll. They thought both female leads, Anne Forrest and Roberta Beatty performed well, but not male lead Frank McGlynn, Jr. They summed up the play by saying they didn't think much of it, but that it might work on Broadway.

Anne Forrest was unable to perform on the second night of the tryout, so featured player Josephine Evans took her part. Evans was thus one of three female cast members arrested, along with twelve men, when the police raided the evening show on September 10, 1930. They were held on $500 bail each, on the charge of giving an indecent show. Besides cast members, the police also arrested Jack Kirkland, and the Brandt father and son who owned the theatre. Forrest and director Lee Elmore were summoned to court two days later.

=== Broadway premiere and reception ===
Though shutdown in Queens, the Broadway premiere went ahead on September 25, 1930 at the Theatre Republic. This was the same night that Zoe Akins' The Greeks Had a Word for It premiered, a coincidence of subject noticed by the Daily News under the joint heading "Two New Dramas about Prostitutes". The reviewer for the Daily News said the play may have been "toned-down" since its encounter with the Queens police, and what remained was "determined melodrama" propelled by Anne Forrest's performance.

The New York Times critic said the play was confused in genre, presenting aspects of melodrama, farce, and burlesque, while the character of Johnnie was also a puzzle when compared to the song. They also implied Kirkland had at least three co-writers in the version given at the Republic, with nothing in it to trouble Manhattan's police. The Brooklyn Daily Eagle reviewer agreed there was now nothing in the play to alarm the law, but also expressed surprise at how much better the play was than expected. It was "effective melodrama" with Forrest largely responsible, though the comedy was "deplorable".

Forrest left the production on Saturday, October 4, 1930, to be replaced by Helen MacKellar the following Monday. MacKellar was given top billing in newspaper ads, while Forrest had had only below title billing. The production ran at the Republic until Saturday, November 15, 1930.

=== Trial ===
The attorneys for those arrested in Queens filed a motion to request a jury trial, but instead faced a three judge panel in the Queens Court of Special Sessions on November 21, 1930. They were convicted on a 2-1 verdict, with Jack Kirkland given the harshest sentence, of three months detainment in a workhouse. Kirkland and the rest were given suspended sentences, with the threat of jail time if they offended again, while their attorney prepared an appeal.

== Adaptations ==
=== Film ===
- Frankie and Johnny (1936 film)
