= Badger game =

Confidence trick

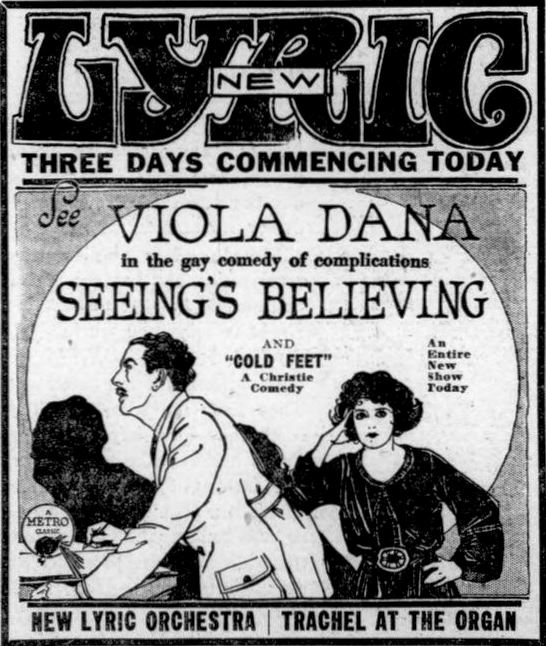
A badger game is often a plot device in American films such as Seeing's Believing (1922).

The badger game is an extortion scheme or confidence trick in which the victims are tricked into compromising positions in order to make them vulnerable to blackmail. Its name is either derived from the practice of badger-baiting or, according to Webster, from the 19th century nickname for natives of Wisconsin, “The Badger State,” who once allegedly suffered from a disparaging reputation for cheating and trickery.

== Description ==
In its simplest form, the badger game proceeds thus: a married man begins an extramarital affair. Another man, posing as the other woman's husband or brother, then "discovers" the affair; he then demands money from the man to keep the affair secret. Unknown to the man having the affair, both the woman and the man who demands the money had prearranged the situation and were conspiring against him.

The woman may also claim that the sexual encounter was non-consensual and threaten the victim with a rape, sexual assault, or sexual harassment charge.

Variants of the trick involve luring the victim with the promise of a homosexual act, underage children, child pornography, a bizarre sexual fetish, or some other activity carrying a legal penalty and/or social stigma.

In the most typical form of the trick, an attractive woman approaches a man, preferably a lonely married man of considerable financial means from out of town, and entices him to a private place with the intent of maneuvering him into a compromising position, usually sexual. Afterwards, an accomplice blackmails the victim with photographs or similar evidence.

A longer con might involve the woman targeting an older wealthy gentleman through a false courtship (or romance scam) which could also have the potential to develop into a gold digger marriage if he proposes or agrees to her suggestion.

Another form involves accusations of professional misconduct. In an example of this form of the trick, a "sick" woman visits a physician, describing symptoms that require her to disrobe for the examination, require the doctor to examine the genitals, or ensure similar scrutiny from the doctor. During the examination an "outraged husband" or "outraged father" enters the room and accuses the doctor of misconduct. The "sick" woman, who is of course part of the deception, takes the side of her accomplice and threatens the doctor with criminal charges or a lawsuit. This form of the badger game was first widely publicized in an article in the August 25, 1930, edition of Time magazine.

Non-sexual versions of this trick also exist, particularly among ethnic and religious groups with strong social taboos, for example inducing a Mormon to gamble or drink alcohol in violation of his religious vows, and then demanding money to keep the indulgence secret and thus preserve his reputation.

== See also ==
- Clip joint
- Entrapment
- Hamilton–Reynolds affair
- Honey trapping
- "The Medicine Man"
- Romance scam
