= Frankie and Johnny (1936 film) =

1936 film by Chester Erskine and John H. Auer

Frankie and Johnnie
- Directed by: Chester Erskin; John H. Auer
- Written by: Moss Hart; Lou Goldberg
- Story by: Jack Kirkland
- Based on: Frankie and Johnny by Jack Kirkland
- Produced by: William Saal
- Starring: Helen Morgan; Chester Morris; Lilyan Tashman
- Cinematography: Joseph Ruttenberg
- Music by: Victor Young
- Distributed by: Republic Pictures
- Release date: May 1, 1936
- Running time: 66 minutes
- Country: United States
- Language: English

Frankie and Johnny (filmed and released as Frankie and Johnnie) is an American film, starring Helen Morgan and Chester Morris in the title roles.

== Plot ==
The story is based on the popular song and the 1926 play, with the girl Frankie, unlucky in love, and her boyfriend Johnnie, "who done her wrong."

Johnnie Drew claims to be a simple country boy, but is really a card sharp who fleeces a succession of riverboat gamblers aboard the S. S. Natchez on the Mississippi River. After the boat docks in St. Louis, Johnnie visits the local music hall owned by hardboiled Lou. There he meets Frankie, a singer, and woos her away from her loyal sweetheart Curley. Frankie and Johnnie get married, but the restless Johnnie is bored with married life and spends his free time gambling. He also romances the glamorous Nellie Bly and plans a trip to New Orleans. Frankie borrows money from Lou to make the trip with him, only to find that Johnnie will be traveling with Nellie. Overcome with anger, Frankie shoots Johnnie. At his funeral, she reunites with Curley.

== Production ==
The film was produced at the Biograph Studios in The Bronx, New York during the summer of 1934, just after the production code took effect. The tawdry subject matter ran afoul of various censor boards, and the film was withheld from release for almost two years. It was finally distributed by Republic Pictures in 1936.

Columnist Julia Gwin was present for the filming: "Chester Erskin, the director, was working [Chester Morris] until three and four o'clock in the morning to enable Morris to get back to his studio to meet a shooting schedule."

== Cast ==
- Helen Morgan as Frankie
- Chester Morris as Johnnie Drew
- Lilyan Tashman as Nellie Bly
- Florence Reed as Lou
- Walter Kingsford as Timothy
- William Harrigan as Curley
- Cora Witherspoon as Mrs. Thornton
- Jean Brooks as Girl in Cabaret

== Reception ==
Frankie and Johnnie opened to disappointing reviews, most of them expressing regret that the censors had laundered much of the flavor out of the story. Motion Picture Daily reported that the film, "after having passed through successive processes of renovation with an eye on the production code, emerges as ineffectual fare." Variety agreed: "Because it has been en route for about two years and has been given a careful dehydration by the Hays Code office, not too much was anticipated of Frankie and Johnnie when it finally was unveiled. But as it stands, the picture is unusually slovenly entertainment," adding, "It will be lucky to make dual bookings [double-feature programs] in most localities." The most charitable review came from Film Curb: "It has its moments of goodness and its moments of badness. Sort of an in-and-outer. Helen Morgan sings in her well-known style and those that like her will approve."
