= God's Little Acre =

1933 novel by Erskine Caldwell

- First edition
- Author: Erskine Caldwell
- Language: English
- Genre: Southern Gothic
- Publisher: Viking Press
- Publication date: 1933
- Publication place: United States
- Media type: Print (hardback & paperback)
- OCLC: 30624122
- Dewey Decimal: 813/.52 20
- LC Class: PS3505.A322 G6 1995

God's Little Acre is a 1933 Southern Gothic novel by Erskine Caldwell about a dysfunctional farming family in Georgia that is obsessed with sex and wealth. The novel's sexual themes were so controversial that the New York Society for the Suppression of Vice asked a New York state court to censor it. Although controversial, the novel became an international best seller with over 10 million copies sold, and was published as an Armed Services Edition during WWII. God's Little Acre is Caldwell's most popular novel, although his reputation is often tied to his 1932 novel Tobacco Road, which was listed in the Modern Library 100 Best Novels. God's Little Acre was later adapted as a 1958 film starring Robert Ryan.

== Plot summary ==
The novel is set in rural Georgia during the Great Depression. Ty Ty Walden is a poor farmer who is obsessed with finding gold on his land. He spends much of his time digging for it with his sons Buck and Shaw, while his family struggles with poverty. Ty Ty has also promised to give the profits from a small part of his land to a church, but repeatedly moves its boundaries because he fears finding gold there.

Ty Ty's family includes his daughters Rosamund and Darling Jill, his son Buck and Buck's wife Griselda, and his unmarried son Shaw. Their lives are complicated by poverty, jealousy, and sexual tensions. Pluto Swint, a local farmer who wants to marry Darling Jill, is a frequent visitor to the Walden farm.

At the beginning of the novel, Ty Ty and his sons hear that an albino named Dave Dawson may be able to find gold by dowsing. They bring Dave to the farm and hope that he can help them locate gold. Meanwhile, Ty Ty's son-in-law Will Thompson, a former worker at a textile mill, becomes increasingly determined to reopen the local mill, which has been closed after a dispute between its owners and workers.

Will's relationships with the women in the Walden family create further conflict. He has an affair with Darling Jill and later becomes involved with Griselda, increasing tensions within the family.

Will eventually attempts to reopen the mill himself by entering the plant and turning on its machinery. Security guards hired by the mill owners shoot and kill him. His death leaves Rosamund, Darling Jill, and Griselda devastated.

After Will's funeral, the family returns to Ty Ty's farm. Ty Ty's estranged son Jim Leslie arrives and demands that Griselda leave with him. Buck confronts him and shoots him, killing him.

The violence leaves Ty Ty deeply shocked, but he continues digging for gold. He declares that the acre he had dedicated to God should now follow Buck wherever he goes. The ending strongly suggests that Buck then kills himself with the same shotgun he used to kill Jim Leslie.

== Themes ==
Published by Viking Press in 1933, God's Little Acre was in part influenced by textile mill strikes in Gastonia, North Carolina. The novel is "proletarian", focusing on the "plight of workers deprived of union protection." Similarly, the novel deals with the misuse and abuse of land in the South.

== Controversy ==
God's Little Acre contained scenes considered sexually explicit, leading the New York Society for the Suppression of Vice to take Caldwell and Viking Press to court for disseminating pornography. Over 60 literary figures supported the book, placing pressure on the New York State Magistrates' Court, which ruled in favor of Caldwell's rights to freedom of expression. Caldwell counter-sued the literary society for false arrest and malicious prosecution.

In 1947, the city of Saint Paul, Minnesota, banned the novel for being pornographic.

In 1950, the book was banned in Boston upon the recommendation of the Watch and Ward Society, one of that society's final activities of censorship. (Boston continued censoring works into the 1960s.)

== Cultural references ==
In the 1955 film Mister Roberts, Ensign Pulver (Jack Lemmon) proudly states that he read God's Little Acre through to the end. Mr. Roberts (Henry Fonda) is not impressed and tells Doc (William Powell), "He's been reading God's Little Acre for over a year now. He's underlined every erotic passage and added exclamation points. And after a certain pornographic climax, he's inserted the words 'Well written.'"

In the Amazon television series Goliath (S1 E2), Billy Bob Thornton's character uses God's Little Acre as a reference for redefining rock-bottom in an Alcoholics Anonymous meeting.

In The Mary Tyler Moore Show episode "The Birds and ... Um ... Bees" (S2 E1), when asked how he learned about sex for the first time, Ted Baxter says: "I read a book. Told me everything I needed to know. ...God's Little Acre."

The 1974 film "The Apprentice of Duddy Kravitz" mentions the book approximately 25min in.
