= Dorothy Priesing =

Dorothy Jean McLemore Priesing (31 July 1910 - 28 June 1999) was an American composer, pianist and music educator who studied with Nadia Boulanger. In additional to composing musical works, she co-authored two textbooks about piano pedagogy.

Priesing was born in Nantucket, Massachusetts, to Elizabeth Baxter and William D. McLemore. She held B.S. and M.A. degrees from Columbia University, and also studied at the Juilliard School of Music and in Fontainebleu, France. Her teachers included Nadia Boulanger, Howard Brockway, James Friskin, and Rubin Goldmark. She married Elwood R. Priesing in 1941 and they had one son.

Priesing received the Coolidge Prize for Composition at Juilliard. She was a lecturer at Columbia University and Juilliard, then became an associate professor at Montclair State College (today Montclair State University) in 1953. In 1957, her composition Now is the Caroling Season was recorded commercially by Fred Waring and the Pennsylvanians on Capitol Records. In 1973, Priesing and cellist David Finckel performed a reduction of Patsy Rogers' Concerto for Tenor Violin and Symphony Orchestra for the composer and some friends.

A member of the American Society of Composers, Authors, and Publishers (ASCAP), Priesing's works were published by Carl Fischer Inc., Shawnee Press, and William C. Brown Publishing Company. They include:

== Band ==
- Invocation

== Books ==
- Basic Piano for the College Student (with Russel Hayton and Alex Zimmerman)
- Language of the Piano: A Workbook in Theory and Keyboard Harmony (with Libbie Tecklin)

== Chamber ==
- Violin Sonata

== Piano ==
- Three Piano Preludes

== Vocal ==
- "April Swim" (soprano)
- Carol of the Children (women's chorus)
- Four Songs on Poems by James Joyce
- Noel
- Now is the Caroling Season (mixed chorus)
- Sister Awake (women's chorus)
- Three Elizabethan Songs (mixed chorus)
- Wild Swans (women's chorus)
