= Eugene Bonner =

Eugene Bonner, sometimes given as Eugene MacDonald Bonner (June 24, 1889 – December 8, 1983) was an American composer and music critic. As a composer he was particularly known for his operas. In 1931 his opera The Venetian Glass Nephew was staged at the Vanderbilt Theatre on Broadway. He wrote as a music critic for a variety of publications in Europe and the United States, including The Outlook, the Daily Mirror, the Brooklyn Eagle, Cue, and the New York Herald Tribune. He also served as managing editor of the journal The Musical Record.

== Early life and education ==
Born in Jacksonville, North Carolina, Eugene Bonner was the son of William Tripp Bonner and Eugenia Higgins Bonner. His mother died while giving birth to him, and he was raised in Washington, North Carolina by his great-aunt, Mrs. Mary MacDonald, and her husband, Dr. John MacDonald. In his youth he studied piano with his next door neighbor, Charlotte Brown, and attended preparatory school in Warrenton, North Carolina.

In 1907 Bonner began music studies at the Peabody Conservatory of Music in Baltimore; earning an organ scholarship at that institution the following year. His teachers at Peabody included Howard Brockway (composition).

After graduating from Peabody in 1910, he went to Europe to pursue further studies in music. From 1911 to 1917 he spent time studying with a variety of teachers in England; including Landon Ronald, Herbert Bedford, Liza Lehmann, and Cyril Scott.

== Composing career ==
While studying in England, Bonner published his first music composition with the London publishing house, Weeks & Co.

== Later life ==
In 1955 Bonner moved to Taormina, Sicily. He lived there until his death in Taormina on December 8, 1983.

== Partial list of works ==
=== Operas ===
- Barbara Frietchie (1921)
- Celui qui Épousa une Femme Muette (1923)
- The Venetian Glass Nephew (1927)
- The Gods of the Mountain (1936)
- Frankie and Johnnie (1945)

=== Other stage works ===
- The Young Alexander (1929).

=== Orchestral works ===
- White Nights (1925)
- Taormina, little suite (1939)
- Concertino for Piano and String Orchestra (1945)

=== Chamber music ===
- Piano Quintet (1925)
- Suite Sicilienne for Violin and Piano (1926)

=== Vocal music ===
- Whispers of Heavenly Death, 3 songs for Voice and Orchestra (1922)
- Flutes for Voice and 4 Instruments (1923)
