= Otis Bardwell Boise =

American composer and music educator (1844–1912)

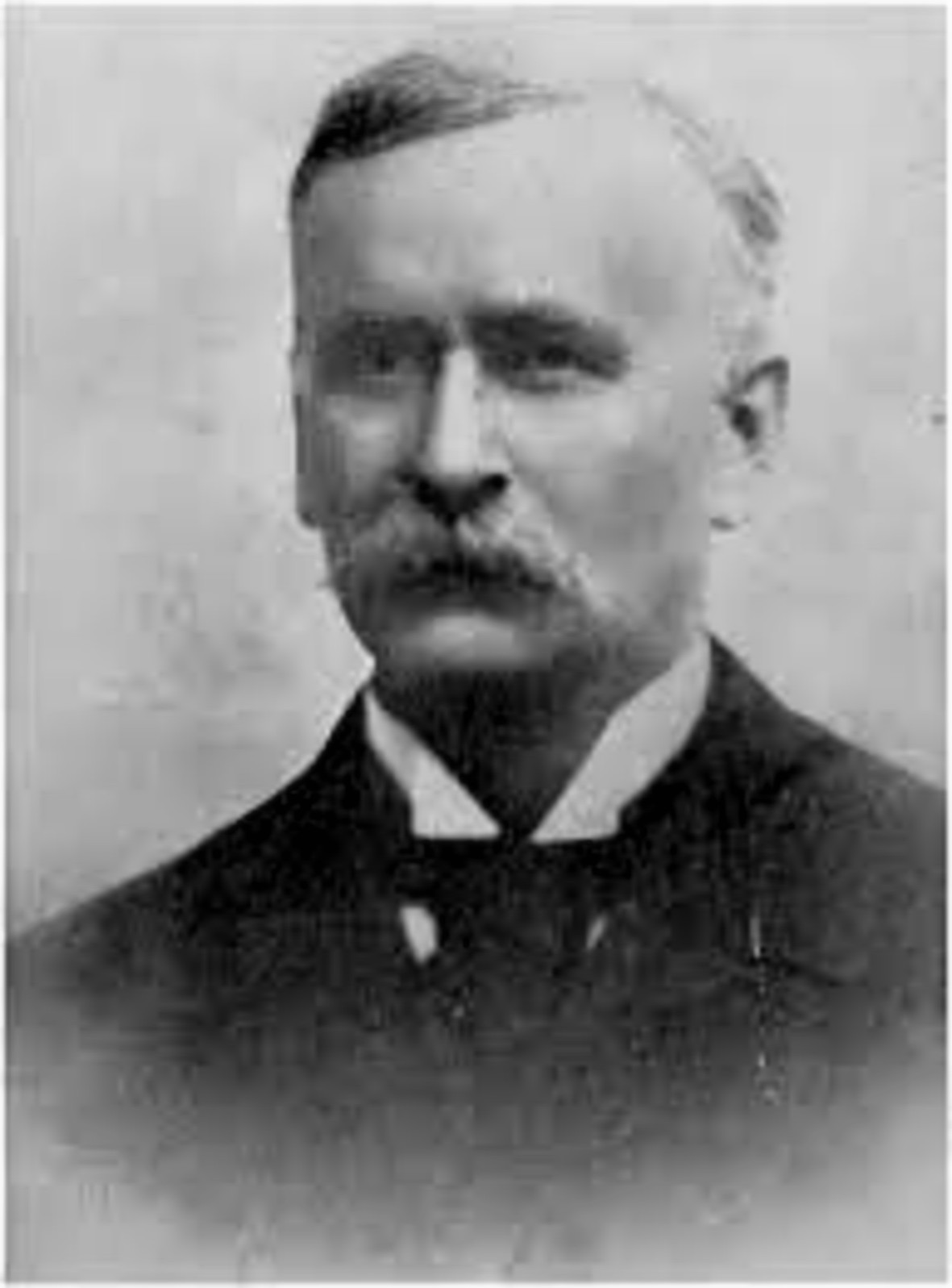
Otis Bardwell Boise (1844–1912)

Otis Bardwell Boise (August 13, 1844 – December 2, 1912) was an American composer and music educator.

== Biography ==
Boise was born in Oberlin, Ohio. When he was a child, his family moved to 19th-century American male composers Cleveland, Ohio. He showed his musical talent early on and became organist at St Paul's Church in 1858. From May 1863 until September 1865 he studied at the Leipzig Conservatory. His teachers include Ignaz Moscheles, Ernst Ferdinand Wenzel, Ernst Friedrich Richter, Moritz Hauptmann, as well as Ferdinand David and Carl Reinecke.

For a short time he taught in Berlin at the academy of Theodor Kullak. From 1865 to 1870 he was an organist and music teacher in Cleveland. In 1869 he married his wife Anastasia Virginia (1846–1937), who translated many German songs into English, in Cleveland. From 1870 to 1876 Boise worked as a teacher for harmony and composition at the Conservatory of Music and as organist of the Presbyterian church in New York City.

Between 1876 and 1878 he lived in Weimar and Wiesbaden in Germany. Boise often visited Franz Liszt, with whom he discussed composition and American music education, and played through manuscripts. He also spend time with Joachim Raff.

In 1878 he returned to New York and continued teaching. From 1888 until 1901 he worked as a teacher for music theory and composition in Berlin and afterwards at the Peabody Conservatory in Baltimore, Maryland, where he died.

Boise composed a symphony, two ouvertures, a piano concerto, choirs and songs. His works are heavily influenced by Liszt. His piano concerto in G Minor (1874) has been described as the possibly earliest piano concerto by a native-born American composer.
