= Tobacco Road (play) =

Play adapted by Jack Kirkland

- First UK edition (1949)
- Original language: English
- Written by: Jack Kirkland
- Subject: Tobacco Road by Erskine Caldwell
- Genre: Drama
- Setting: A farm in Georgia during the Great Depression

Premiere
- Date: December 1933
- Place: Theatre Masque; New York City

Tobacco Road is a play by Jack Kirkland first performed in 1933, based on the 1932 novel of the same name by Erskine Caldwell. The play ran on Broadway for a total of 3,182 performances, surpassing Abie's Irish Rose to become the longest-running play in history at the time. As of December 2024, it was still the 21st longest-running Broadway show in history, as well as being the second-longest running non-musical ever on Broadway.

== Productions ==
Tobacco Road opened on Broadway at the Theatre Masque (the John Golden Theatre) on December 4, 1933, transferred to the 48th Street Theatre (demolished in 1955), where it ran from July 16, 1934, through September 1934, and then moved to the Forrest Theatre (the Eugene O'Neill Theatre) where it ran until May 31, 1941, for a total of 3,182 performances.

It was revived three times on Broadway:

- From September 5 through October 3, 1942, at the Forrest Theatre
- September 4 through October 30, 1943, at the Ritz Theatre
- March 6 through March 18, 1950, at the 48th Street Theatre

Tobacco Road was banned in the United Kingdom for many years, finally being licensed for public performance in 1949.

The 1950 revival was staged by the Negro Drama Group, which recast the play with African-American actors, including Powell Lindsay as Jeeter and Evelyn Ellis as Ada. Ellis also directed the production, possibly making her the first African American to direct a play on Broadway.

The La Jolla Playhouse production ran from September 30 through October 26, 2008.

The American Blues Theater production ran from May 21 through June 20, 2010.

== Plot synopsis ==
In desolate farm country in Georgia, the profitable tobacco crop has given way to cotton plantations, but poor planting practices have depleted the soil. The Lester family were once sharecroppers, but are now poverty-stricken and unable to cope with the bleak life they face. Jeeter Lester, the patriarch, lives in squalor with his wife Ada, their two children, 16-year-old Dude and 18-year-old Ellie May, and his mother. Ada is suffering from pellagra and Ellie May has a harelip, Jeeter and Dude are thin and emaciated, and the family wears tattered clothing.

Sister Bessie Rice, a stout preacher of about 40, decides to marry Dude, who agrees when she promises to buy him a car. When Capt. Tim Harmon tells the family that the house and property are owned by the bank, Jeeter is given a chance to earn money so that they may keep living there, but he refuses.

The youngest daughter Pearl tries to escape from her much older husband Lov Bensey, but Ada is run over by Dude's car as she attempts to help Pearl. As Ada lies dying, Pearl escapes and runs away; Jeeter sends Ellie May to Lov instead.

== Characters and cast ==
- Jeeter Lester – Henry Hull
- Ellie May Lester – Ruth Hunter
- Dude Lester – Sam Byrd
- Ada Lester – Margaret Wycherly
- Capt. Tim Harmon – Lamar King
- Granma Lester – Patricia Quinn
- Sister Bessie Rice – Maude Odell
- Lov Bensey – Dean Jagger
- Pearl – Reneice Rehan

== Critical reception ==
The play received unfavorable reviews, but gained audiences after ticket prices were cut from US$3.30 (equivalent to $82.08 in 2025) to US$1.10 (equivalent to $27.36 in 2025). The show also toured, becoming "phenomenal" on the road, playing repeat engagements.

Critics differed as to whether Tobacco Road should be seen primarily as a tragedy, a comedy, or a "social document" in the tradition of Zola or Gorky. Brock Pemberton imagined a scientific analysis of the play would reveal "two principal elements are equal proportions of impure, adulterous sex and blasphemous, profane, elemental comedy, with a slight residuum of social documentation."

Brooks Atkinson wrote: "The theatre has never sheltered a fouler or more degenerate parcel of folks than the hardscrabble family of Lester...It is the blunt truth of the characters he is describing, and it leaves a malevolent glow of poetry ... As Jeeter Lester, Henry Hull gives the performance of his career. Plays as clumsy and rudderless as 'Tobacco Road' seldom include so many scattered items that leave such a vivid impression."

The play was banned in major cities such as Chicago and Detroit for being sensational and immoral.

Contemporary scholar Jordan Schildcrout wrote: "Tobacco Road remains a challenging play precisely because it doesn't clearly express a single ideological perspective. Are the poor responsible for their own condition, thus relieving the viewer of any sense of responsibility, or is poverty a social and political issue that demands action? Audiences for the play can find conflicting answers to those questions."

== Connection to the American eugenics movement ==
Tobacco Road has been critically analyzed for its ties to the early 20th-century eugenics movement in the United States, particularly its portrayal of rural Southern poverty as a hereditary condition requiring intervention, including compulsory sterilization. The novel and play depict the Lester family—impoverished white sharecroppers in Georgia—as embodying eugenic stereotypes of "feeble-mindedness," moral degeneracy, and uncontrolled reproduction, traits often attributed to genetic rather than socioeconomic causes. Author Erskine Caldwell drew direct inspiration from his father Ira Caldwell's published "family studies" in eugenics journals, including a series titled The Bunglers (1929–1930), which profiled real Georgia families as irredeemably "degenerate" and advocated sterilization over social reform. Scholars argue that Tobacco Road functions as a fictionalized eugenic family study, reinforcing contemporary arguments that poverty among poor whites was dysgenic and that sterilization was a pragmatic public health measure—especially during the Great Depression, when reducing welfare dependency was a stated goal of several Southern eugenics boards. The work appeared at the height of U.S. eugenics policy implementation, following the 1927 Supreme Court decision in Buck v. Bell, which upheld compulsory sterilization laws in over 30 states. Georgia, the setting of Tobacco Road, enacted its sterilization law in 1937—one of the last states to do so—targeting individuals labeled "idiots," "imbeciles," or "feeble-minded," categories frequently applied to poor rural whites. While Caldwell framed the story as social critique, critics note its alignment with eugenic rhetoric that reform was futile and that preventing reproduction among the "unfit" was the only viable solution. The play's long Broadway run (1933–1941) amplified these themes to a national audience, contributing to public discourse on rural degeneracy at a time when over 60,000 Americans—many of them poor Southern whites—were forcibly sterilized under state programs.

== Paramount Theater, Omaha, Nebraska, 1937 ==
Tobacco Road, Paramount Theater, Omaha, Nebraska, 1937

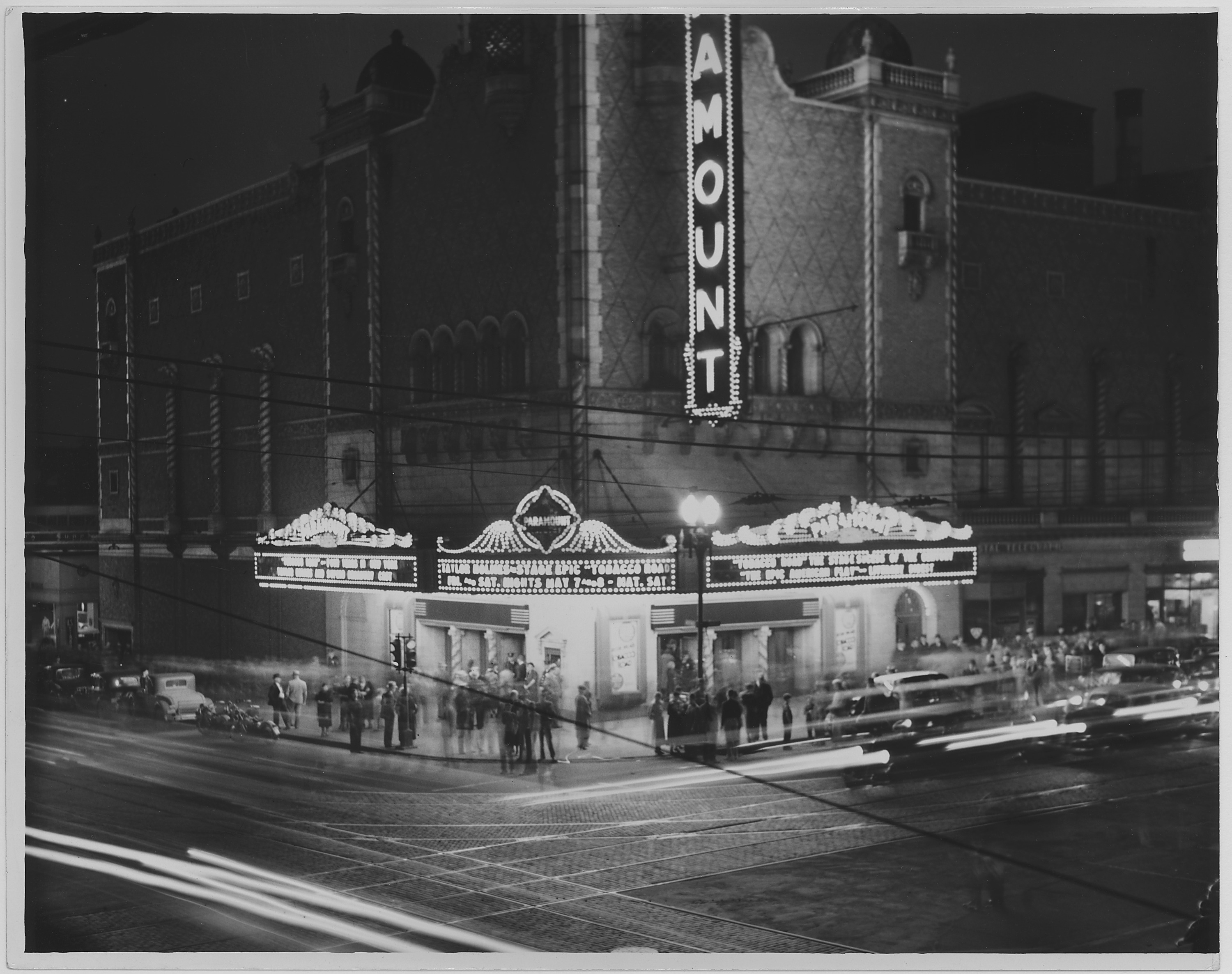
Exterior view

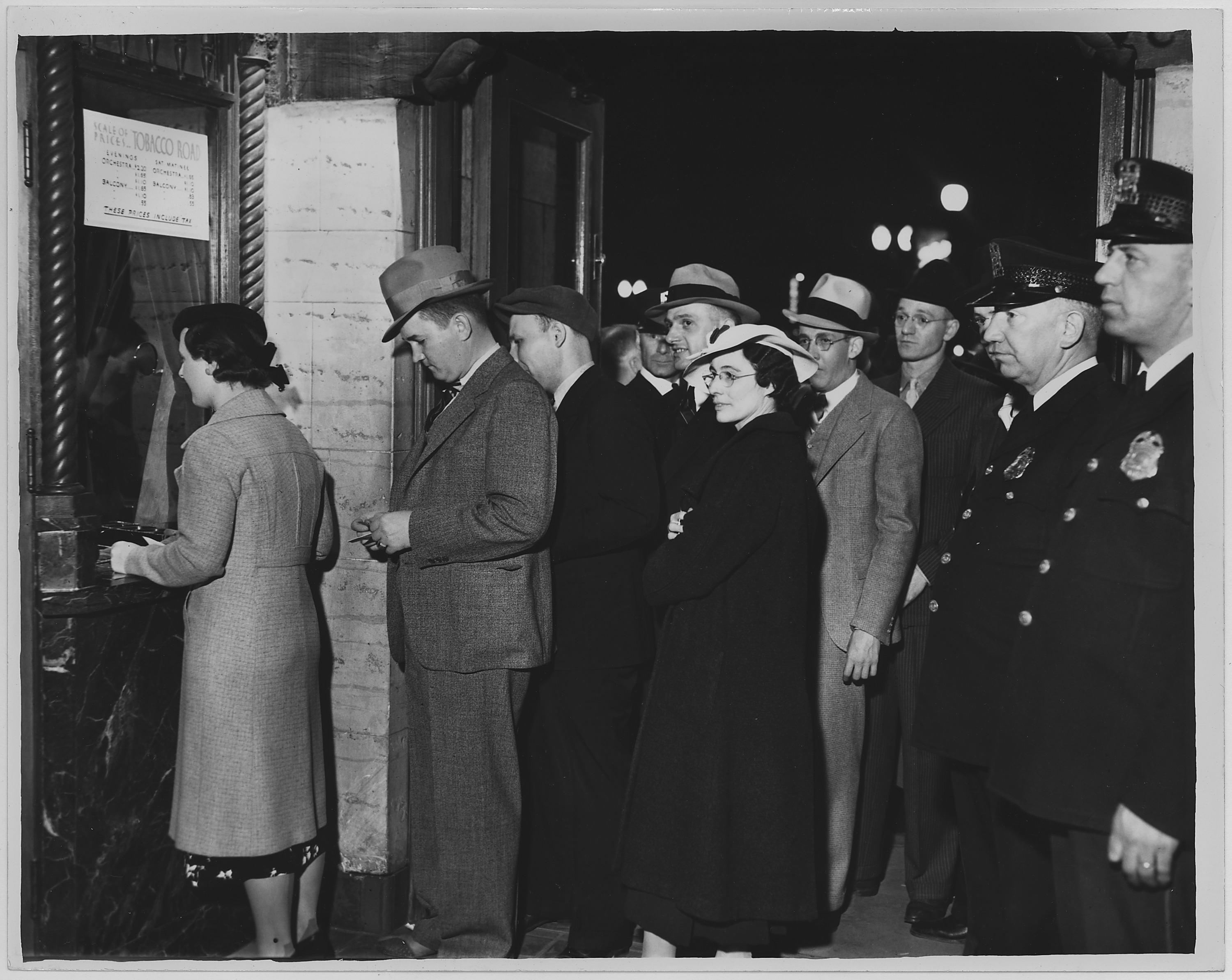
Ticket line

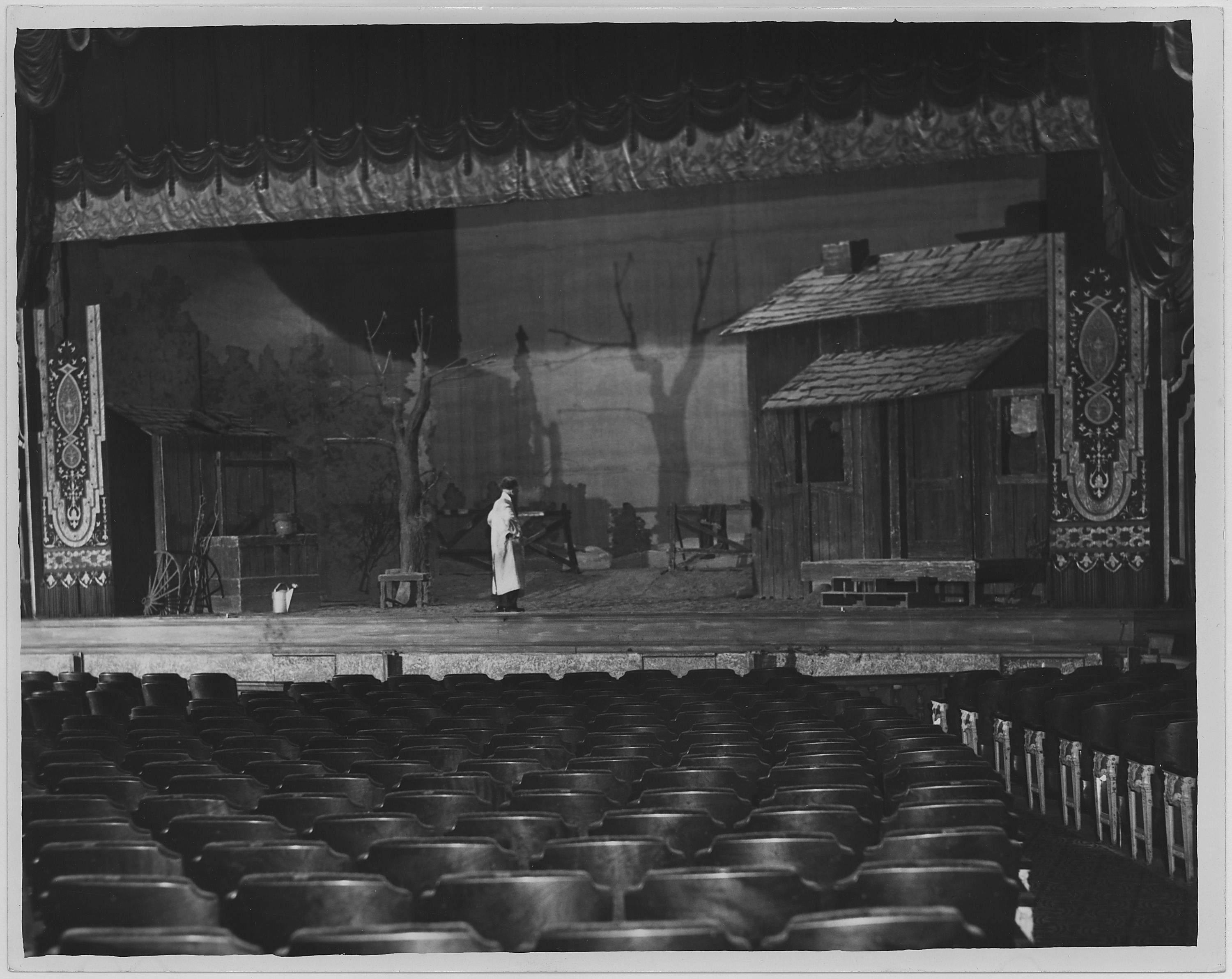
Stage view

| Preceded by Abie's Irish Rose | Longest-running Broadway show 1939–1947 | Succeeded by Life With Father |
