= Tobacco Road (novel) =

1932 novel by Erskine Caldwell

- First edition (Scribners)
- Author: Erskine Caldwell
- Language: English
- Publisher: Charles Scribner's Sons
- Publication date: 1932
- OCLC: 1246052
- LC Class: PS3505.A322 T6

Tobacco Road is a 1932 Southern Gothic novel by Erskine Caldwell about a dysfunctional family of Georgia sharecroppers during the Great Depression. Although often portrayed as a work of social realism, the novel contains many elements of black comedy and sensationalism which made it a subject of controversy following its publication. It was dramatized for Broadway by Jack Kirkland in 1933 and ran for eight years. A 1941 film version, played mainly for laughs, was directed by John Ford, with many of the darker plot elements altered or removed.

In 1998, the Modern Library ranked Tobacco Road number 91 on its list of the 100 best English-language novels of the 20th century. The novel was included in Life magazine's list of the 100 outstanding books of 1924–1944.

Tobacco Road has sold over 10 million copies.

== Setting ==
Tobacco Road is set in rural Georgia during the worst years of the Great Depression. It depicts a family of poor white tenant farmers, the Lesters, as some of the many small Southern cotton farmers made redundant by the industrialization of production and the migration into cities. The main character of the novel is Jeeter Lester, an ignorant and sinful man who is redeemed by his love of the land and his faith in the fertility and promise of the soil.

The precise setting of the novel is unclear. The Jeeters' home is said at one point to be located on "the most desirable soil in the entire west-central part of Georgia", but other passages describe it as being close to the Savannah River and Augusta, which are in eastern Georgia. These references would appear to place their home in Richmond County, of which Augusta is the county seat. The county in which the Jeeters live is also said to be adjacent to Burke County, which Richmond County is. However, the county seat of the Jeeters' county is not Augusta but the fictional town of Fuller. The Jeeters are also said to live near the fictional town of McCoy.

== Plot summary ==
Lov Bensey, a friend of the Lesters, walks to his home at the train yard coal chute. He has walked seven and a half miles to get a sack of winter turnips for 50 cents, which is half of his daily wage. On his way home, he stops by the Lesters to talk to Jeeter about Jeeter's 12-year-old daughter Pearl, to whom Lov is married. While Lov is talking to Jeeter, the book introduces the reader to 16-year-old Dude, the youngest of the Lester boys; Ada, Jeeter’s wife; Grandma Lester; and Ellie May, an 18-year-old girl with a grotesque cleft lip. The entire family, acting in complete desperation, works to steal the turnips from Lov, who then becomes nauseated by the sight and leaves for home.

At this point, the preacher Bessie enters the scene. Sister Bessie Rice, like Ellie May, also has a deformity of the face. Bessie’s nose contains no bone, and so when looking straight at her face one can see straight into her nostrils, like a pig. Despite this, Jeeter is still attracted to her. She does some preaching and praying for everyone’s sins, and then proposes marriage to Dude. However, Dude is more interested in her offer of letting him drive the new automobile that she anticipates purchasing than in actually marrying her. Bessie then goes home to her hovel to ask God whether or not she and Dude should get married.

Jeeter has lived on the same plot of land since he was born, and even though his standard of living continues to decline until he and his family begin to starve, Jeeter stubbornly refuses to move to the city to make a better life for himself by working in a cotton mill. Such a life, he insists, would be impossible for him to live.

Alongside Jeeter’s preoccupation with farming the land is his preoccupation with his own imminent death. Ada as well is fixated on her death, but their morbidity does not take the form of lamentation or self-pity. Ada's main concern is that she not be buried in her tattered, old, out-of-style calico dress, and Jeeter's main concern is that his body not be left in the old corn storage shed where it might be eaten by rats. He has had a terrible phobia of rats ever since he saw his dead father’s face half-eaten by a rat the day of his funeral.

When Sister Bessie returns the next day to the Lester house, she exclaims that God has given her his approval for the marriage between Dude and herself. The two then start the long walk to Fuller in order to purchase a new Ford for the purpose of traveling around the country and preaching. Once they are in the auto showroom, the salesmen take advantage of Bessie's rural naïveté to pull off a quick and profitable sale, while at the same time constantly making fun of her deformed nose. Later, Dude and Bessie go off to get their marriage certificate and are questioned by the county official, who reprimands Bessie for attempting to marry a boy of 16 years. (Bessie claims she is only 31 years old to the Lesters, but admits to 39 years at the registrar's office.) They get the marriage license, and the anxious Dude gets to drive the automobile again. He incessantly sounds the car horn whenever he gets behind the steering wheel to drive off somewhere.

Over the course of the next two days, the automobile slowly gets wrecked more and more. First there is an accident with a wagon in which they end up killing the negro driver, and then Dude drives into a stump. The seats get torn by Jeeter’s blackjack wood, which he attempts to sell in the city of Augusta. The engine irreparably becomes damaged by being run without enough oil. On top of this, they sell the spare tire and wheel for three dollars in order to pay for gasoline, food, and a night at a disreputable hotel where Bessie willingly gets prostituted from room to room by the manager. Some days later Bessie refuses to let Jeeter ride in her car anymore, which so upsets him that he kicks her off the land. When she physically attacks him, Ada and Jeeter proceed to beat Bessie and poke her with sticks until she and Dude take off in the car.

While fleeing from Ada and Jeeter’s onslaught, Dude backs the Ford right over Grandma Lester, who then lies with her face mashed into the sand, near dead. Lov runs down to see Jeeter, and asks him if he knows what happened to Pearl, who had run away to Augusta to be free of Lov and the bleak and desperate country life surrounding her. Jeeter notes that more than a few of his daughters have run away to the city. After this discussion about the girls running away, the two notice Grandma’s corpse and drag her into the field to bury her.

Lov departs and Caldwell reflects on Jeeter's position as a tenant farmer in the South. Even though Jeeter, like so many others around him, had the urge to plant a crop during this time of the year, there was nothing he could do. His landlord was an absentee who abandoned Jeeter and the rest of those who had lived on his land and given him shares of their crop in exchange for credit for seeds and fertilizer. The stores in the city would not grant any more credit to Jeeter or any of the other farmers because it was too risky and there were too many asking for it.

Jeeter sets a fire to burn off broom sedge and hopes somehow to find enough credit to farm his land that spring. As Jeeter and Ada sleep, sparks from the fire ignite the shingles of their house, which burns to the ground, killing them in their sleep. As the novel closes, Dude makes his first mention of working: He voices the same thoughts of plowing the Lester land that Jeeter had expressed throughout the story.
