= Jack Kirkland =

American dramatist

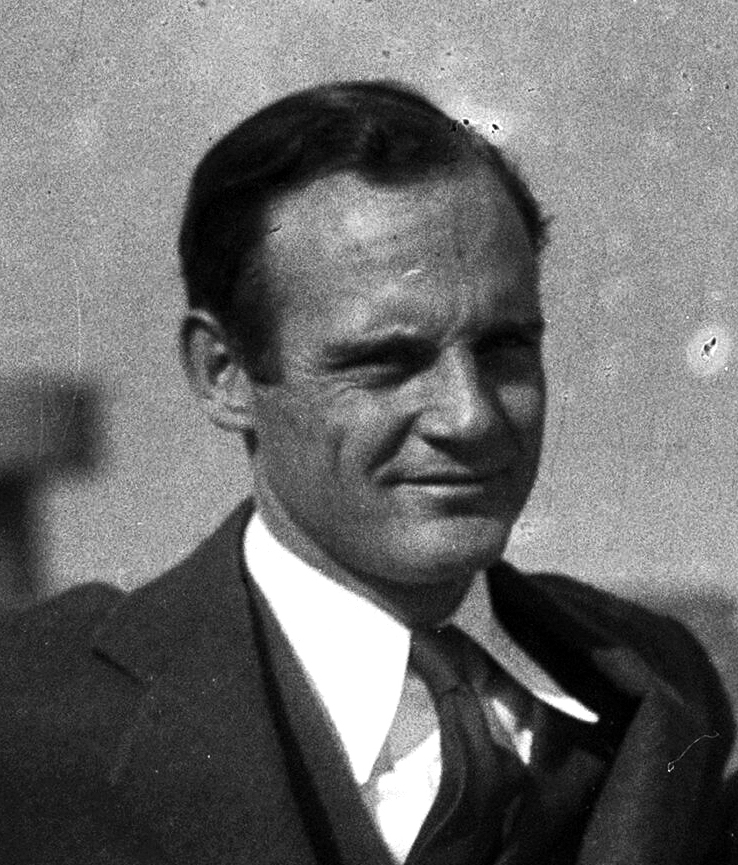
- Kirkland in 1931
- Born: July 25, 1902; St. Louis, Missouri, U.S.
- Died: February 22, 1969 (aged 66); New York City, U.S.
- Occupations: Playwright, producer, director, screenwriter
- Known for: Tobacco Road
- Spouses: Nancy Carroll (m. 1924; div. 1931); Jayne Shadduck (m. 1934; div. 1935); Julie Laird (m. 1936; div. 1937); Haila Stoddard (m. 1938; div. 1947); Nancy Hoadley (m. 1948)

Jack Kirkland (July 25, 1902 – February 22, 1969) was an American playwright, producer, director and screenwriter.

Kirkland's greatest success was the play Tobacco Road, adapted from the Erskine Caldwell novel. His other plays included Frankie and Johnny, Tortilla Flat, Suds in your Eye, Mr. Adam, Man with the Golden Arm, and Mandingo.

Kirkland collaborated with Melville Baker on several screen projects including Zoo in Budapest (1933) starring Loretta Young and Gene Raymond, Now and Forever (1934) starring Gary Cooper, Carole Lombard and Shirley Temple, and The Gilded Lily (1935) starring Claudette Colbert, Fred MacMurray and Ray Milland.

Kirkland was married several times, including a marriage to actress and producer Haila Stoddard, and he had several children with several wives, one of whom was the ballerina Gelsey Kirkland.
