= Erskine Caldwell =

American novelist (1903–1987)

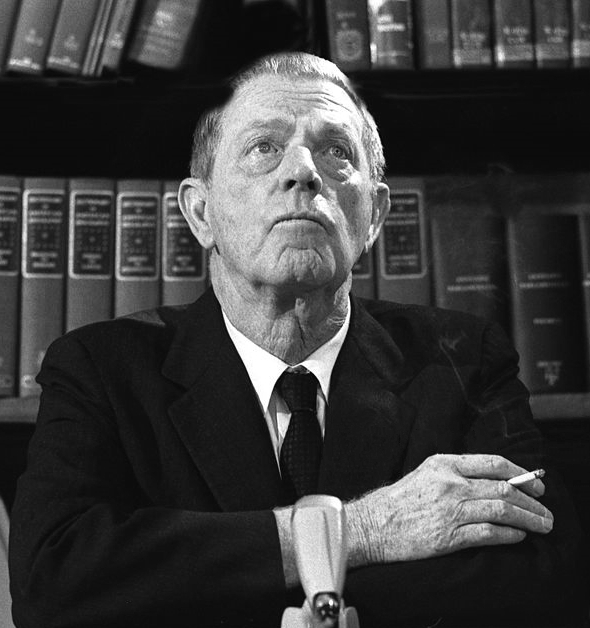
- Caldwell in 1975
- Born: Erskine Preston Caldwell; December 17, 1903; Moreland, Georgia, U.S.
- Died: April 11, 1987 (aged 83); Paradise Valley, Arizona, U.S.
- Resting place: Scenic Hills Memorial Park, Ashland, Oregon
- Occupations: Novelist, short story writer
- Spouses: Helen Lannegan (m. 1925, divorced) Margaret Bourke-White (m. 1939; div. 1942)
- Children: 3
- Writing career
- Notable works: Tobacco Road; God's Little Acre; All Out On The Road To Smolensk
- Movements: Social realism, American literary regionalism

Erskine Preston Caldwell (December 17, 1903 – April 11, 1987) was an American novelist and short story writer. His writings about poverty, racism and social problems in his native Southern United States, in novels such as Tobacco Road (1932) and God's Little Acre (1933), won him critical acclaim.

With cumulative sales of 10 million and 14 million copies, respectively, Tobacco Road and God's Little Acre rank as two of the best-selling American novels of all time, with the former being adapted into a 1933 play that set a Broadway record for consecutive performances, since surpassed.

== Early years ==
Caldwell was born on December 17, 1903, in the small town of White Oak, Coweta County, Georgia. He was the only child of Associate Reformed Presbyterian Church minister Ira Sylvester Caldwell and his wife Caroline Preston (née Bell) Caldwell, a schoolteacher. Rev. Caldwell's ministry required moving the family often, to places including Florida, Virginia, Tennessee, South Carolina and North Carolina. When he was 15 years old, his family settled in Wrens, Georgia. His mother Caroline was from Virginia. Her ancestry included English nobility which held large land grants in eastern Virginia. Both her English ancestors and Scots-Irish ancestors fought in the American Revolution. Ira Caldwell's ancestors were Scots-Irish and had also been in America since before the revolution and had fought in it.

Caldwell's mother, a former teacher, tutored her son at home. Caldwell was 14 when he first attended a school.

Caldwell attended but did not graduate from Erskine College, a Presbyterian school in nearby South Carolina.

== Career ==
He dropped out of Erskine College to sign aboard a boat supplying guns to Central America. Caldwell entered the University of Virginia with a scholarship from the United Daughters of the Confederacy, but was enrolled for only a year. He then became a football player, bodyguard, and salesman of "bad" real estate.

After two more enrollments at college, Caldwell went to work for the Atlanta Journal, leaving in 1925 after a year, then moving to Maine where he stayed for five years, producing a story that won a Yale Review award for fiction and two novels of the Georgia poor.

Caldwell's first published works were The Bastard (1929) and Poor Fool (1930), but the works for which he is most famous are his novels Tobacco Road (1932) and God's Little Acre (1933). His first book, The Bastard, was banned and copies of it were seized by authorities. With the publication of God's Little Acre, the New York Society for the Suppression of Vice instigated legal action against him for The Bastard. Caldwell was arrested at a book-signing there but was exonerated in court.

In 1941, Caldwell reported from the USSR for Life magazine, CBS radio and the newspaper PM. He wrote movie scripts for about five years. Caldwell wrote articles from Mexico and Czechoslovakia for the North American Newspaper Alliance.

== Personal life ==
Through the 1930s Caldwell and his first wife Helen managed a bookstore in Maine. Following their divorce Caldwell married photographer Margaret Bourke-White, collaborating with her on three photo-documentaries: You Have Seen Their Faces (1937), North of the Danube (1939), and Say, Is This The USA (1941). During World War II, Caldwell obtained a visa from the USSR that allowed him to travel to Ukraine and work as a foreign correspondent, documenting the war effort there.

After he returned from World War II, Caldwell took up residence in Connecticut, then in Arizona with third wife, June Johnson (J. C. Martin). In 1957, Caldwell married Virginia Moffett Fletcher, who had drawn illustrations for a recent book of his, moving to Twin Peaks in San Francisco, later moving to Paradise Valley, Arizona, in 1977. Of his residence in the San Francisco Bay Area, he once said: "I live outside San Francisco. That's not exactly the United States." During the last twenty years of his life, his routine was to travel the world for six months of each year, taking with him notebooks in which to jot down his ideas. Many of these notebooks were not published but can be examined in a museum dedicated to him in the town square of Moreland, Georgia, where the home in which he was born was relocated and dedicated to his memory.

Caldwell died from complications of emphysema and lung cancer on April 11, 1987, in Paradise Valley, Arizona. He is buried in Scenic Hills Memorial Park, Ashland, Oregon. Although he never lived there, his stepson and fourth wife, Virginia, did, and wished him to be buried near his family. Virginia died in December 2017 at age 98.

== Politics ==
Erskine Caldwell's political sympathies were with the working class, and he used his experiences with farmers and common workers to write stories portraying their lives and struggles. Later in life he presented public seminars on the typical conditions of tenant-sharecroppers in the South.

Disillusionment with the government led Caldwell to compose a short story published in 1933, "A Message for Genevieve." In this story a woman journalist is executed by a firing squad after being tried in a secret court on charges of espionage.

== Works ==
Caldwell wrote 25 novels, 150 short stories, twelve nonfiction collections, two autobiographies, and two books for young readers. He also edited the influential American Folkways series, a 28-volume series of books about different regions of the United States.

- The Bastard (1929)
- Poor Fool (1930)
- American Earth, short stories (1931)
  - later released as A Swell Looking Girl
- Tobacco Road (1932)
  - Tobacco Road (The Play)
    - Adaptation by Jack Kirkland, based on the novel
  - Tobacco Road (The Film)
    - Film directed by John Ford
    - based on the novel and the play
- We Are the Living, short stories (1933)
- God's Little Acre (1933)
- Tenant Farmers, essay (1935)
- Some American People, essay (1935)
- Journeyman (1935)
- Kneel to the Rising Sun, short stories (1935)
- The Sacrilege of Alan Kent (1936)
  - Originally from American Earth
- You Have Seen Their Faces (1937)
  - with Margaret Bourke-White
- Southways, short stories (1938)
- North of the Danube (1939)
  - with Margaret Bourke-White
- Trouble in July (1940)
- The First Autumn (1940)
- Say Is This the USA (1941)
  - with Margaret Bourke-White
- Moscow Under Fire, foreign correspondence (1942)
- Russia at War, foreign correspondence (1942)
- All-Out on the Road to Smolensk, foreign correspondence (1942)
- All Night Long (1942)
  - Subtitled A Novel of Guerrilla Warfare in Russia
- Georgia Boy (1943), linked stories
- Tragic Ground (1944)
- A House in the Uplands (1946)
- The Sure Hand of God (1947)
- This Very Earth (1948)
- Place Called Estherville (1949)
- Episode in Palmetto (1950)
- The Humorous Side of Erskine Caldwell (1951)
  - Edited by Robert Cantwell
- Call It Experience, autobiography (1951)
- The Courting of Susie Brown, short stories (1952)
- A Lamp for Nightfall (1952)
- The Complete Stories of Erskine Caldwell (1953)
- Love and Money (1954)
- Gretta (1955)
- Gulf Coast Stories, short stories (1956)
- Certain Women, short stories (1957)
- Claudelle Inglish (1958)
- Molly Cottontail, children's book (1958)
- When You Think of Me, short stories (1959)
- Jenny by Nature (1961)
- Men and Women, short stories (1961)
- Close to Home (1962)
- The Last Night of Summer (1963)
- Around About America, travel writing (1964)
- In Search of Bisco, travel writing (1965)
- The Deer at Our House, children's book (1966)
- Writing in America, essay (1967)
- In the Shadow of the Steeple (1967)
  - Second autobiography
- Miss Mama Aimee (1967)
- Summertime Island (1968)
- Deep South, travel writing (1968)
- The Weather Shelter (1969)
- The Earnshaw Neighborhood (1971)
- Annette (1973)
- Afternoons in Mid America, essays (1976)
- With All My Might,
  - Third autobiography (1987)
- Erskine Caldwell: Selected Letters, 1929–1955 (1999)
  - Edited by Robert L. McDonald

== Recognition ==
In December 1984, Caldwell was inducted into the American Academy of Arts and Letters.

== Sources ==
- Bode, Carl (March 1956). "Erskine Caldwell: A Note for the Negative". College English. 17 (6): 357–359. doi:10.2307/372378. JSTOR 372378.
- Broadwell, Elizabeth Pell; Hoag, Ronald Wesley (Winter 1982). "Interview: Erskine Caldwell, The Art of Fiction No. 62". Paris Review. Winter 1982 (86).
- Caldwell, Jay E. (2016). Erskine Caldwell, Margaret Bourke-White, and the Popular Front: Photojournalism in Russia. University of Georgia Press. ISBN 9780820350226.
- Cook, Sylvia J. (1983). "Review: Stories of Life/North & South: Selections from the Best Short Stories of Erskine Caldwell". The Southern Literary Journal. 16 (1): 126–130. ISSN 0038-4291. JSTOR 20077726.
- Francis, Leila H. (2010). Erskine Caldwell: A Bibliography of Dissertations and Theses. CreateSpace. ISBN 9781453684368.
- Kitajima, Fujisato. "Recollections of Erskine Caldwell – A Georgia Hero" (PDF). Keiwa College. p. 87–126.
- Kitajima, Fujisato (Spring 1989). "Caldwell in Japan". Southern Quarterly. 27 (3). Hattiesburg: 42.
- Stevens, C. J. (2000). Storyteller: A Life of Erskine Caldwell. John Wade. ISBN 1-882425-11-1.
- Thomas, Phil (July 10, 1983). Review of Stories of Life North & South. The Ledger.
